= Solmetric =

Solar equipment manufacturer in Sebastopol, California, USA

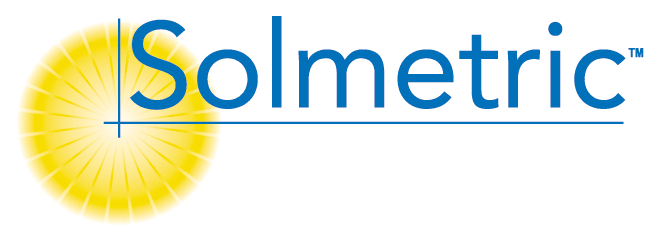
- Founded: 2005
- Founders: Willard MacDonald, Robert MacDonald, Mark Galli
- Headquarters: Sebastopol, CA
- Products: SunEye shade measurement tool, PV Analyzer I-V Curve tracer
- Website: www.solmetric.com

Solmetric Corporation, based in Sebastopol, California, is a manufacturer of solar test and measurement equipment and developer of solar design software. It was founded in 2005 and is best known for its shade measurement tool, the SunEye, and its I-V curve tracer, the PV Analyzer. The award-winning SunEye shade tool is used primarily by residential solar installers. It tells the user when and where shadows will fall so that solar modules can be placed to maximize energy harvest. The PV Analyzer is an I-V curve tracer. It is used for commissioning and troubleshooting commercial and utility scale PV systems.

== History ==
Solmetric was founded by Willard MacDonald, Robert MacDonald, and Mark Galli in 2005. The company was to produce a device to predict and analyze the shade at a potential solar installation site.

Solmetric became a certified B Corporation in 2009. In 2013., The firm was one of the 63 B Corporations listed as Best for The World Environmental Impact Honorees. In January 2014 the firm was acquired by residential installer and solar financier, Vivint Solar for $12 million. In August 2021 after Vivint Solar was acquired by SunRun, two of the original founders purchased Solmetric back from Vivint Solar, and it is now run independently again.

== Products ==
The SunEye-100 was introduced at SolFest in Hopland, California in 2006, to replace the Solar Pathfinder as a device previously used to measure shade . Shade measurements became a particularly important when the California Solar Initiative program began requiring shade measurements in 2006 and solar companies began providing third party financing of solar systems. The product received the 2007 Top 10 Green Building Products of the Year award from US based Building Green, the 2nd place Innovation Award at the 2008 European PV Solar Energy Tradeshow in Staffelstein Germany, and the 2009 Trophy of Innovation from Salon des énergies renouvelables at Eurexpo in Lyon, France. By 2010 it was the primary tool used by residential solar companies for surveying shade. A subsequent version, the SunEye-210 added a fisheye camera, digital compass, digital inclinometer, and GPS. It captures an image of the sky including the horizon, superimposes the sunpaths on top of the image, and calculates the solar access for that location.

The PV Designer layout and simulation software product was first introduced in 2009 at Solar Power International. The software enables the user to layout PV modules on a roof virtually and simulate the energy production. The PV Analyzer I-V curve tracer (“PVA-600”) was introduced in 2010 and could measure strings up to 600 volts and 20 amps. The PVA-1000, introduced in 2013, added 1000 volt, 30 amp capability as well as the SolSensor wireless PV reference which measures the irradiance and module temperature. And, in 2019 the PVA-1500 family was introduced with a 1500 volt rating and WiFi based connectivity. The PVA simultaneously measures the irradiance and module temperature with the SolSensor Wireless PV Reference Sensor. It is used primarily for commissioning and troubleshooting PV systems .
