= Keith Nellesen =

American entrepreneur (born 1967)

- Born: Idaho Falls, Idaho, US
- Education: Brigham Young University
- Occupation: CEO of NUVI
- Years active: 2011–present
- Spouse: Melisa
- Children: 3

Keith Nellesen (born 1967) is an American entrepreneur and the co-founder of Vivint, Inc., a home automation, security and solar energy company. Vivint, Inc. was acquired in late 2012 for $2.2 Billion by the Blackstone Group. Following the sale of Vivint Nellesen invested in NUVI where he subsequently assumed the role of CEO from founder David Oldham. Nellesen, was CEO from May 2014 to October 2015 and again resumed the CEO position from Cameron Jensen in late 2016. Nellesen was previously chairman and CEO at MoneyReef.

== Biography ==
Keith Nellesen grew up in Idaho Falls, Idaho, where he attended Idaho Falls High School. He later attended BYU, where he obtained a Masters of Accountancy in 1992. Following BYU, he was contacted by his old High School friend Todd Pedersen, and the two embarked on establishing the company now known as Vivint (formerly APX Alarm). Under Nellesen’s and Pedersen’s directorship, the firm branched into other venues such as Vivint Solar Energy. After obtaining the buy-out of Vivint by Blackstone, Nellesen embarked on his current business venture, NUVI. Nellesen is the also a founding partner of McColee Partners, a venture capital investment firm specializing in early stage investments.

Keith Nellesen, along with his wife Melisa, contributed the initial donation for the Cole Nellesen Building at Utah Valley University (UVU). This will house the Melisa Nellesen Center for Autism at UVU In June, 2016 Nellesen made a lead donation for UVU's 14,500-square-foot $3.5 million practice and conditioning facility to house its men’s and women’s basketball teams, to be known as the NUVI Basketball Center. He also has a special interest in the Book of Mormon and collects early editions.

== Innovations and awards ==
Company innovations include a First Class restaurant at the Vivint corporate headquarters in Provo where daily meals are provided to employees, a free medical clinic, and various recreational outlets including a University-Class basketball court and a weight room.
