= Solar Power =

Solar power is the conversion of energy from sunlight into electricity.

Solar Power may also refer to:

- Solar Power (album), by Lorde, 2021
  - "Solar Power" (song), 2021
  - Solar Power Tour, the 2022 world tour
- "Solar Power" (Superman: The Animated Series episode), 1997
- Solar Power International, annual conference organized by SEPA and SEIA

== See also ==
- Solar power by country
