= Dr. Elmo and Rhea Eddington House =

Historic house in Utah, United States

- U.S. National Register of Historic Places
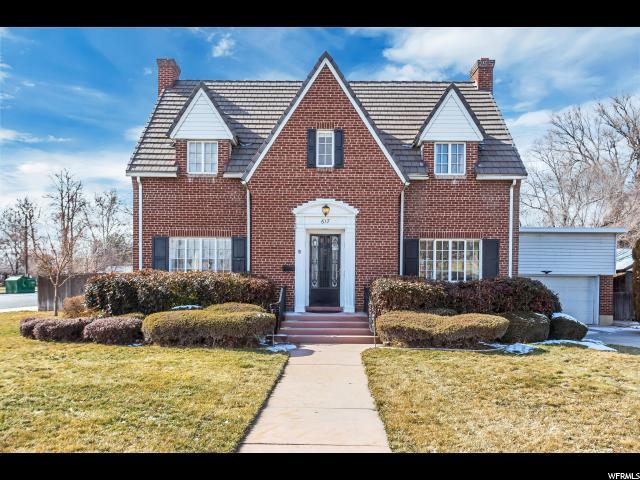

- Location within Utah Location within the United States
- Location: 617 North 100 East; Lehi, Utah
- Coordinates: 40°23′46″N 111°50′46″W
- Area: 0.3 acres (0.12 ha)
- Built: c. 1932
- Architectural style: Late 19th and 20th Century Revivals
- MPS: Lehi, Utah MPS
- NRHP reference No.: 98001459
- Added to NRHP: December 4, 1998

The Dr. Elmo and Rhea Eddington House is a historic house located in Lehi, Utah.

== Description and history ==
It is a 1 1/2-story period style cottage, built of red brick laid in a common-bond pattern, and rests on a concrete foundation, and it was built around 1932. According to its NRHP nomination, it is "one of only 42 Period Revival buildings" in Lehi. Stylistically, it is a combination of Tudor Revival and Colonial Revival elements of architecture.

It was listed on the National Register of Historic Places on December 4, 1998.
