= Todd Pedersen =

Founder of Vivint, Inc

- Born: Todd Richard Pedersen; November 23, 1968 (age 57); Seattle, Washington, US
- Education: Brigham Young University
- Occupation: CEO of Vivint
- Years active: 1997–present
- Spouse: Andie Pedersen
- Children: 5

Todd Richard Pedersen (born November 23, 1968) is an American entrepreneur and the founder of Vivint, Inc., a home automation, security and energy company. Vivint, Inc. was acquired in late 2012 by the Blackstone Group.

== Biography ==
Todd Pedersen was born in Seattle, Washington, the fourth of eleven children, and grew up in Idaho Falls, Idaho, where he attended Idaho Falls High School.

After finishing a two-year mission for his church, he returned and settled in Provo, Utah. In 1992 he began selling pest-control services door-to-door from a small business with 10 employees based in a trailer in Arizona.

A few years later, he switched to a different product, burglar alarms, though using the same marketing technique. He contacted high-school friend Keith Nellesen to assist in this venture. Together, they founded APX Alarm Security Solutions in 1999 in Provo, Utah, utilizing his door-to-door marketing strategy. In 2011 APX Alarm was rebranded as Vivint to reflect its emphasis on living intelligently through home automation. The company became a major competitor in the industry, as well as expanding its marketing through more traditional venues such as television advertising and telephone sales representatives.

Pedersen was featured in the sixth-season finale of the CBS reality show, Undercover Boss in 2015. The experience afforded him valuable insights into his employees' work days.

In 2021 Pedersen stepped down as Vivint's CEO.

=== Innovations ===
Pedersen created a workforce of approximately 13,500 full-time and part-time employees through innovations in employee relations. These innovations include an on-site restaurant at his corporate headquarters in Provo, a free medical clinic, and various recreational areas including a basketball court and a weight room.

Under his direction, the firm branched into Vivint Solar, a solar-energy company.

Outside of his industry, Pedersen has sought innovation in public education, particularly emphasizing use of the abacus in the classroom at early ages to strengthen mathematical skills. He also partners the 501(c)(3) non-profit organization Vivint Gives Back with organizations such as Feed My Starving Children.

Pedersen was named Entrepreneur of the Year by three separate entities, first in 2010 by Ernst & Young, next by the Utah Valley Entrepreneurial Forum in 2012, and in 2013 by MountainWest Capital Network.

In 2015 Pedersen was inducted into the David Eccles School of Business Hall of Fame.

=== Philanthropy ===
In 2019, Pedersen and his wife were the largest donors to Intermountain Health's new hospital annex, which is known as the Pedersen Tower. In 2022, they donated $35 million to Primary Children's Hospital to improve healthcare to kids.

=== Personal life ===
As of 2013 Pedersen lives with his wife and their five children in the Provo, Utah area, and is a member of the Church of Jesus Christ of Latter-day Saints.

In 2016 Pedersen was involved in a fatal accident during the SCORE Baja 500 off-road race. Pederson lost control of his vehicle while navigating a turn and slid down a hill before colliding with spectators. One person died and two others were injured. He was briefly detained by Mexican authorities, but later released. Mexican officials said investigation was ongoing, but the event appeared to be an accident rather than a criminal act. Observers reported poor crowd control at the event, and also said spectators were not normally allowed at the site of the accident.
