= Werenski =

Wetterich is a surname. Notable people with it include:

- Richy Werenski (born 1991), American golfer
- Zach Werenski (born 1997), American ice hockey player

== See also ==
- Warenski
