= Brad White (defensive lineman) =

American football player (1958–2022)

No. 90, 92, 62
- Position: Defensive lineman

Personal information
- Born: August 18, 1958; Rexburg, Idaho, U.S.
- Died: July 16, 2022 (aged 63); Florence, Alabama, U.S.
- Listed height: 6 ft 2 in (1.88 m)
- Listed weight: 250 lb (113 kg)

Career information
- High school: Skyline (Idaho Falls, Idaho)
- College: Tennessee
- NFL draft: 1981: 12th round, 310th overall pick

Career history
- Tampa Bay Buccaneers (1981–1984); Indianapolis Colts (1984–1986); Minnesota Vikings (1987)

Career NFL statistics
- Sacks: 3
- Stats at Pro Football Reference

Bradley Dee White (August 18, 1958 – July 16, 2022) was an American professional football player who was a defensive lineman for six seasons in the National Football League (NFL) with the Tampa Bay Buccaneers, Indianapolis Colts, and Minnesota Vikings. He played college football for the Tennessee Volunteers.

== Early life and education ==
White was born on August 18, 1958, in Rexburg, Idaho. He was the oldest of four children. Growing up, White worked on the family potato farm in Idaho Falls. He started playing football while in fourth grade and was coached by his father for several years. He attended Skyline High School in Idaho Falls, where he was a top football player and state champion wrestler. White earned all-state honors in both sports and also was the state champion in discus throw and shotput. Sports Illustrated later named him one of the "Top 50 Greatest Sports Figures from Idaho". He is an inductee into the Idaho High School Football Hall of Fame.

White committed to the University of Tennessee, arriving on August 16, 1976, after driving 2,800 miles. Football practice started on August 18, which was his 18th birthday. Things "almost immediately headed downhill," and he became "an athlete in waiting," seeing no varsity action in his first two years. White, suffering from depression and homesickness, nearly quit the team and headed home.

In 1976, White appeared in two games on the junior varsity football team, against Kentucky and Lees–McRae. He redshirted for the 1977 season. In 1978, he made the varsity team and became one of their top defensive performers, posting 45 tackles in the first four games. He made his varsity debut on September 16 against the UCLA Bruins, starting before an attendance of over 82,500. "In 1976 and 1977, I played before about 2,500 people. The largest single audience for a JV game was, I guess, 1,500. You can imagine how it felt when I started against UCLA, my first varsity appearance, before more than 82,500," he said.

In the 1979 season, White led Tennessee in "big plays" (sacks, TFLs, fumble recoveries, forced fumbles) and made a team-leading seven sacks. In the 1980 season, White's senior year, he tied for first on the team in "big plays", having recorded five sacks, five tackles-for-loss and two forced fumbles.

After his senior year, White was selected to play in the 1981 Japan Bowl and the East–West Shrine Bowl. White finished his college career with 19 sacks, 245 tackles, 24 tackles-for-loss, four forced fumbles and two fumbles recovered in three seasons at the varsity level.

== Professional career ==
White was selected in the 12th round (310th overall) of the 1981 NFL draft by the Tampa Bay Buccaneers. Despite being a 12th round pick, he impressed in training camp and made the final roster as backup nose tackle, becoming one of only six rookies to make the team. At first, they had him play exclusively on the special teams. Against the Philadelphia Eagles on October 25, White blocked a 54-yard field goal, which was the first time this was accomplished in team history. "On field goal attempts, I'm what they call the 'jumper,' the guy who's supposed to block the kick," White said. The Buccaneers eventually made the playoffs, but lost 0–38 to the Dallas Cowboys in the Divisional Round. White played every regular season game in the season and also appeared in their one playoff game, recording 22 tackles on the year.

In a strike-shortened 1982 season, White played in all nine regular season games and made three tackles. He helped the Buccaneers compile a 5–4 record and make it to the playoffs, where they lost to the Dallas Cowboys for the second consecutive year. In the following season, White appeared in all 16 games, but did not start any, as Tampa Bay finished 2–14. He recorded a total of 20 tackles on the season.

Despite impressing in the 1984 preseason, and coach John McKay declaring White to be the team's best backup nose tackle and defensive end, White was released at the final roster cuts in August. His release was described as "the biggest surprise of all" by The Tampa Tribune. McKay said that the play of new signings Brison Manor and Byron Braggs contributed to his release. "It came as a complete surprise," White said.

On August 31, White was signed by the Indianapolis Colts. He played as second-string nose tackle for most of the season, behind Leo Wisniewski. White mostly appeared on special teams, but became a starter for the final two games of the year after Wisniewski was injured. They were the first two starts of his career. White finished the season with 15 games played, two as a starter, and 39 tackles, including 13 solo stops. He also made two sacks for a loss of 16 yards and pressured the quarterback into throwing the ball away nine times, which was fourth-highest on the team.

After Wisniewski announced his plans to sit out the 1985 season, White was named the Colts' starting nose tackle. White had his best year as a professional in 1985, starting 15 out of 16 games and making 97 tackles, leading the team's defensive line as the Colts finished 5–11. He also made one sack. White was released in August 1986 after losing a training camp battle to Willie Broughton.

In 1987, White was signed by the Minnesota Vikings as a replacement player during the NFLPA strike. He appeared in one game, starting in a 7–27 loss to the Chicago Bears before being released. It was the final game of his NFL career.

White played six NFL seasons and finished his career with 73 games played, 18 as a starter, and three sacks. He also unofficially made at least 181 tackles.

== Later life and death ==
White later worked for Anderson Press and TNT Fireworks. He resided the last 31 years of his life in Florence, Alabama. With his wife, Cathy, White had two children.

White died on July 16, 2022, at the age of 63.
