= Jurich =

Jurich is a surname. Notable people with the name include:

- Jackie Jurich (born 1918), American boxer
- Lynn Jurich (born c. 1979), American businesswoman
- Tom Jurich (born 1956), American college sports administrator and footballer

== See also ==
- Jurich Carolina (born 1998), Curaçaoan footballer
