= Wines Park =

Park in Utah, United States

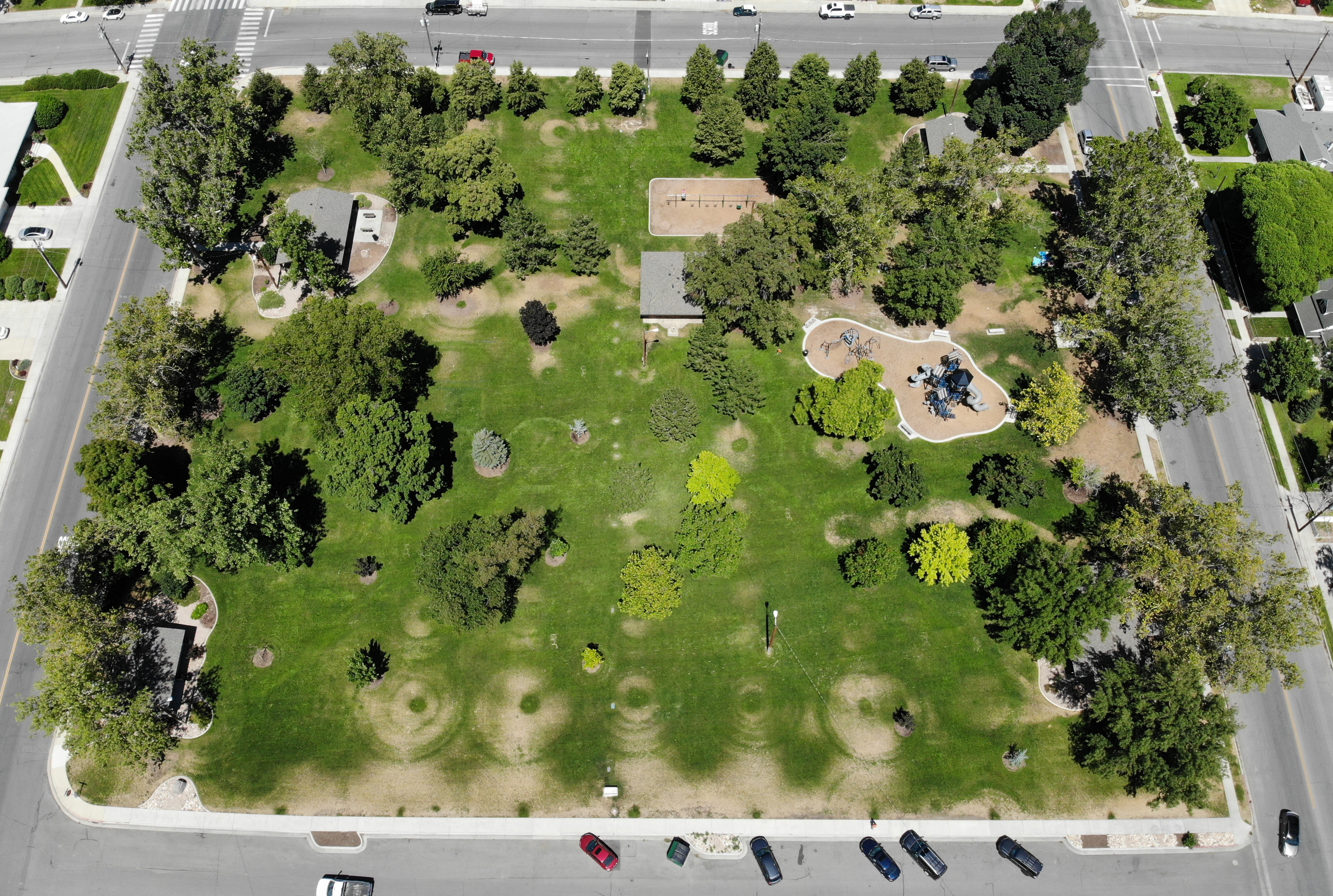
- An aerial view of Wines Park seen from the south
- Interactive map of Wines Park
- Location: Lehi, Utah, United States
- Coordinates: 40°23′40″N 111°50′55″W

Wines Park is a park in Lehi, Utah, United States. It is dedicated to Margaret Wines and covers one city block, between Center Street and 100 East, and 500 and 600 North Streets. It has four pavilions, restrooms, playgrounds, and trees.

Many local events are held at Wines Park, including reunions, Relief Society socials, Courts of Honor for the Scouts, weddings, birthday parties, and band concerts. Over the years, children have used the park to learn football and baseball and practice cheerleading.
