= Vivint =

American smart home services provider

Vivint Smart Home, Inc.
- The current Vivint logo, revealed on May 5th, 2025.
- Type: Subsidiary
- Traded as: NYSE: VVNT (2020–2023)
- Industry: Security systems, fire detection, home automation
- Founded: 1997; 29 years ago (as APX Alarm Security Solutions)
- Founder: Todd Pedersen; Keith Nellesen
- Headquarters: Provo, Utah, U.S.
- Key people: Rasesh Patel, David Porter
- Revenue: ▲US$1,682 million (2022)
- Operating income: ▲US$−154 million (2022)
- Net income: ▲US$−51 million (2022)
- Total equity: ▼US$1,702 million (2022)
- Number of employees: 12,000 (2022)
- Parent: NRG Energy
- Website: vivint.com
- Footnotes; Financials as of December 31, 2022. References

Vivint Smart Home, Inc. (stylized as vivint) is a Provo, Utah-based manufacturer of smart home and home security products. Its product lines include cameras, locks, safety sensors, thermostats, and lighting, along with associated monitoring and installation services. The company is a subsidiary of NRG Energy, which acquired Vivint in 2022 for $2.8 billion.

As of 2026, Vivint had over 2 million customers in the United States, and managed 27 million devices.

== History ==
In 1999, Keith Nellesen and Todd Pedersen co-founded APX Alarm Security Solutions in Lehi, Utah. At the time, the company sold and installed security systems. APX Alarm Security Solutions rebranded as Vivint in February 2011. Vivint was acquired by The Blackstone Group in November 2012.

The company launched Vivint Solar, a solar energy company, in 2011. Vivint Solar went public in October 2014 and was later purchased by Sunrun.

Vivint's former CEO Todd Pedersen appeared on the CBS television show Undercover Boss in February 2015.

In January 2020, Vivint completed a merger with the special-purpose acquisition company Mosaic Acquisition Corp. and became a publicly traded company on the New York Stock Exchange.

In December 2022, Houston-based NRG Energy announced that it would acquire Vivint for $2.8 billion.

== Products and services ==
Vivint offers home security products, including doorbell cameras, smart thermostats, indoor cameras, and integrations with lighting. In 2019, Vivint launched products for car security, and outdoor home security cameras.

In 2017, Vivint announced a partnership with Airbnb to allow hosts to integrate Airbnb accounts with Vivint products. In 2018, Vivint collaborated with Google to include two Google Home Mini devices in starter kits.

== Philanthropy ==
In February 2014, the company donated $1 million to the Utah Valley University, along with a $1 million investment from Vivint's CEO, to establish a professional sales program and a Smart Lab for marketing research.

In 2015, Vivint became the official safety sponsor for Autism Speaks. Between 2015 and 2023, Vivint acquired the naming rights to rename the Utah Jazz's home arena to Vivint Arena, where in April 2018 Vivint added a new sensory room at the arena for children with autism spectrum disorder.

In 2023, under the Vivint Gives Back program the company's employees packed and delivered 40,000 meal kits in cooperation with the Granite Education Foundation for children.

== Reception ==
The 2017 J.D. Power 2017 Home Security Satisfaction Study ranked Vivint as the "Highest in Home Security Customer Satisfaction" among home security brands. The 2020 Home Security Satisfaction Study ranked Vivint second, behind AT&T Digital Life.

Prior to its acquisition by NRG, Vivint settled lawsuits with Arkansas, Oregon, Ohio, and Nebraska along with two class-action lawsuits for alleged violations of the Telephone Consumer Protection Act of 1991. In 2018, ADT agreed to a $10 million settlement with Vivint after ADT claimed agents misled nearly 1,000 customers to sign up.

In May 2021, Vivint was fined $20 million for violations of the Fair Credit Reporting Act under Federal Trade Commission Act of 1914 when sales representatives used the names and identities of people without their consent in the place of customers who failed credit checks. Vivint then sold the debt to collectors in violation of the FTC's Red Flags Rule.

In December 2021, CPI Security alleged that Vivint sales representatives used deceptive tactics to acquire CPI's customers, including claiming that Vivint acquired CPI. In March 2022, Vivint paid $400,000 in penalties and restitution after the Arizona Attorney General alleged Vivint's sales representatives used deceptive marketing practices, including false representations of Vivint services, false claims that the customer's security company was being bought by Vivint, and non-consensual extensions of contracts.

Newsweek recognized Vivint on the Most Loved Workplace list in 2022, America’s Best Customer Service list in 2024, and on the 2025 Excellence List. Forbes Home named Vivint the Best Home Security Company of 2022 and 2024 and Forbes named Vivint as the 2024 Best for Custom Smart Home Integration. CNET named Vivint on the 2022 CNET Awards list and 2024 Best professional security system, best build-as-you-go.

PC Magazine named Vivint a 2022 Best Smart Home Security System and recognized Vivint in 2024 for The Best Smart Home Security Systems for 2024 and as one of the best security systems for professional home monitoring. Utah Business presented Vivint employees with a 2023 30 Women to Watch recognition, a 2023 HR Achievement award, a 2025 40 Under 40 award, and a 2025 Marketing and Communications Social Media Marketing award.

== See also ==
- List of home automation software
- List of private security companies
- List of Utah companies
