= Warenski =

Warenski is a surname and can refer to:

== People ==
- Buster Warenski (1942–2005), custom knifemaker
- Lisa Warenski (born 1970), Salt Lake City-based dancer and choreographer
- Ludwik Tadeusz Waryński (1856–1889), Polish socialist

== Other ==
- Warenski-Duvall Commercial Building and Apartments, Murray, Utah
