= Idaho Falls School District =

School district in Idaho, United States

Idaho Falls School District #91
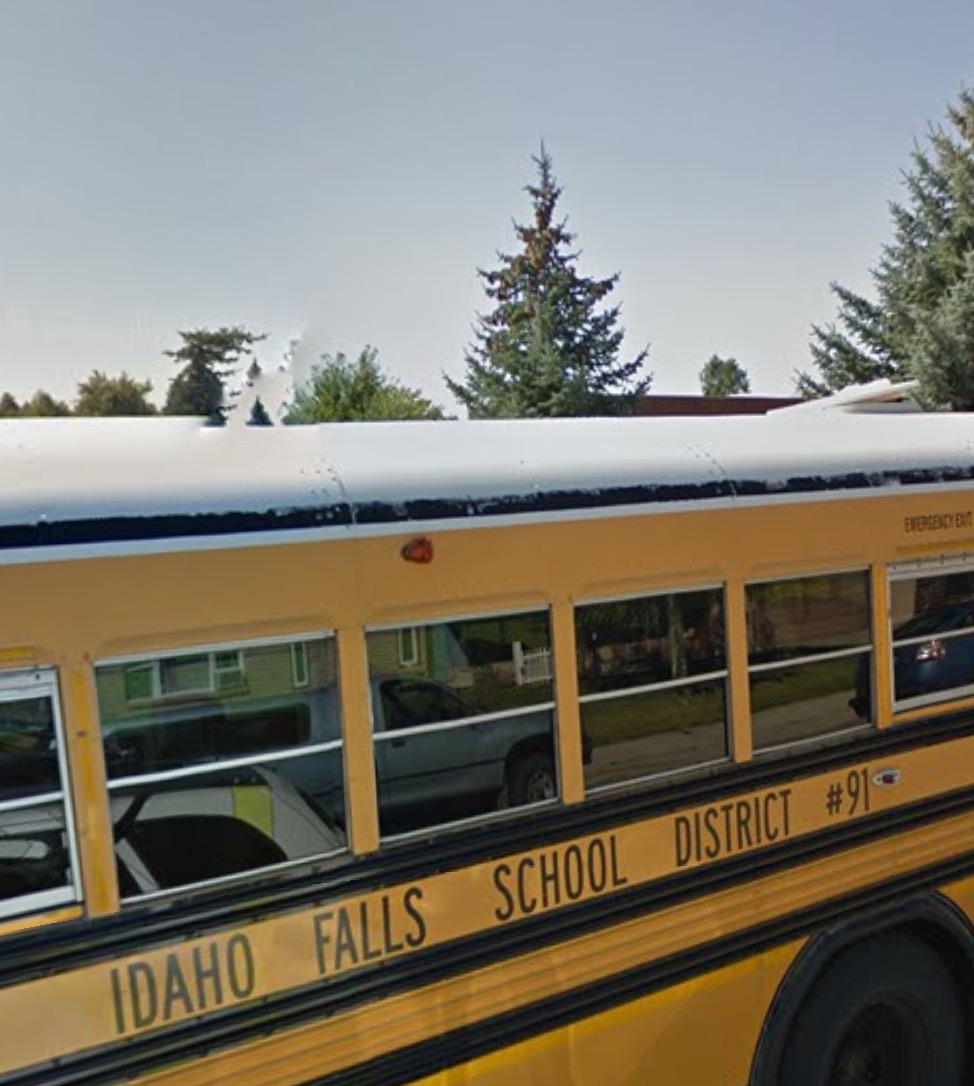

Location
- 690 John Adams Pkwy. Idaho Falls, Idaho United States

District information
- Type: Public
- Motto: "A World Class Education"
- Grades: K-12
- Established: 1947
- Superintendent: Karla LaOrange

Students and staff
- Students: 9,905 (2023)
- Teachers: 504
- Staff: 796
- Athletic conference: High Country (5A)

Other information
- Website: www.ifschools.org

Location in the United States
Location in Idaho Falls, Idaho

The Idaho Falls School District #91 is a public school district in the U.S. state of Idaho. District #91 serves about 10,742 students of Idaho Falls, Idaho, and parts of rural Bonneville County in 18 schools, making it the seventh-largest by enrollment in the state. The district has: 12 elementary schools serving students in K-6, two middle schools serving students in grades 7-8, and two high schools serving students in grades 9-12, along with an alternative high school and Compass Academy, a magnet high school through the New Tech Network.

== Schools ==
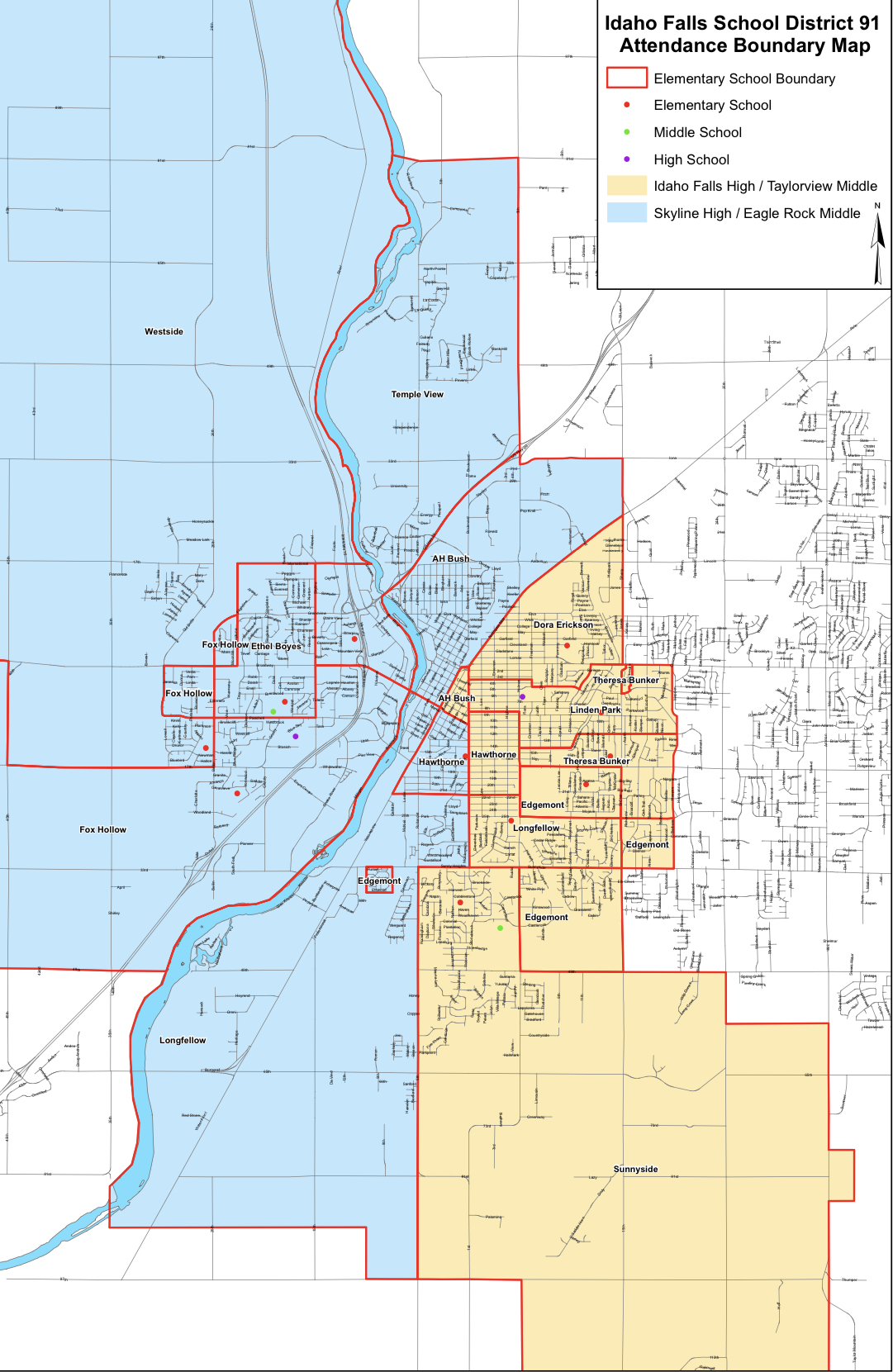
School Attendance Boundaries

=== High schools ===
- Idaho Falls High School

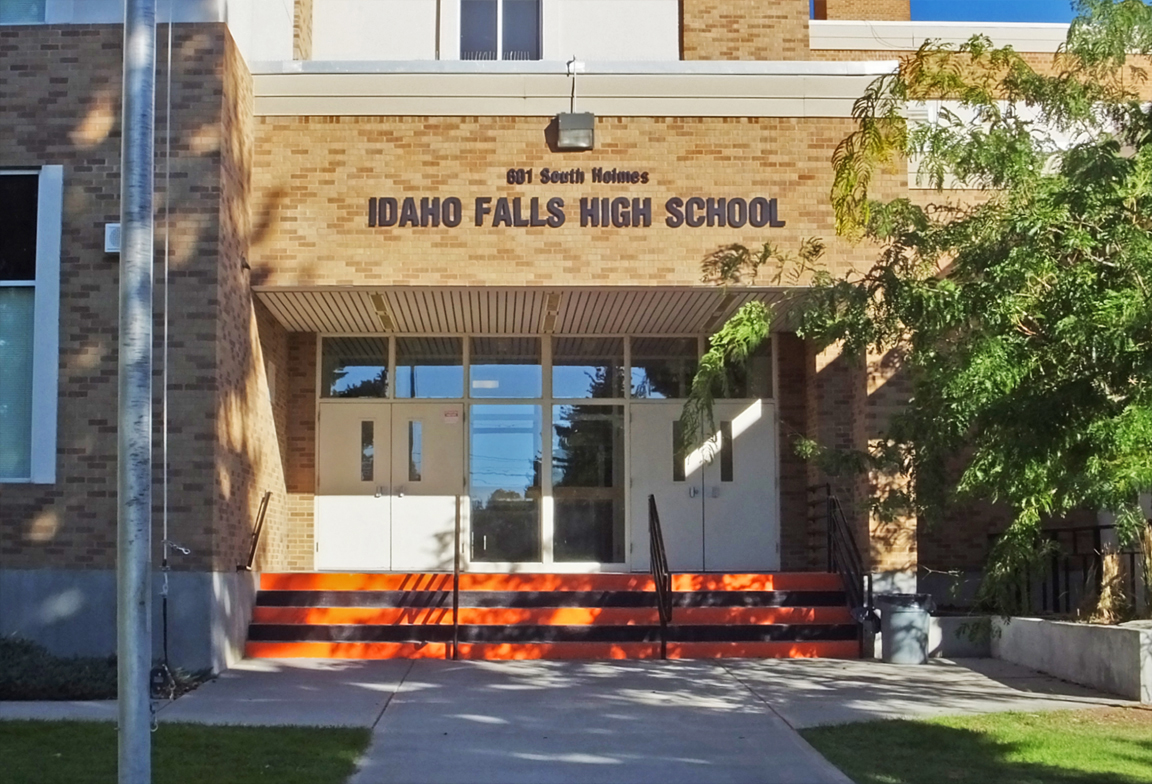
Idaho Falls High School

- Skyline High School

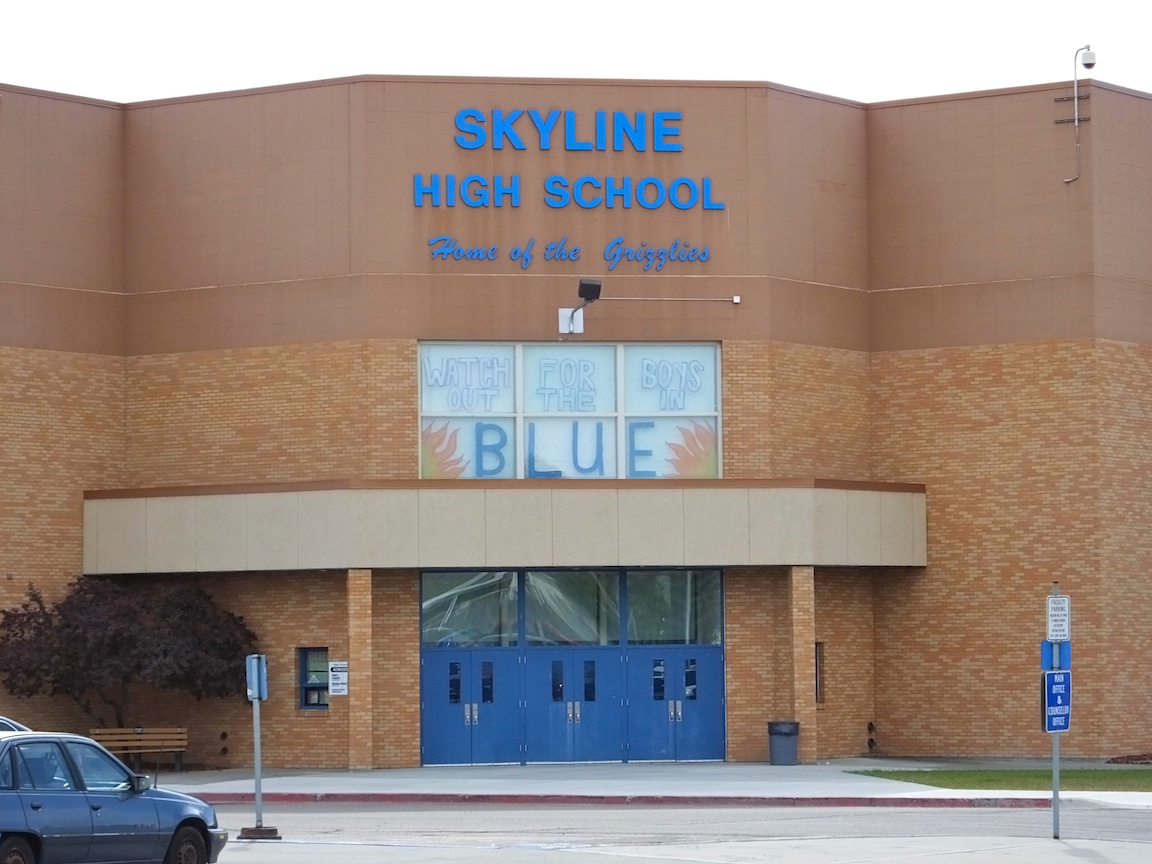
Skyline High School, Idaho Falls, Idaho, United States

=== Magnet High Schools ===
- Compass Academy

=== Alternative High Schools ===
- Emerson Alternative High School

=== Middle schools ===
- Eagle Rock Middle School

Feeder Schools:
• A.H. Bush Elementary School
• Ethel Boyes Elementary School
• Fox Hollow Elementary School
• Hawthorne Elementary School
• Longfellow Elementary School
• Temple View Elementary School
• Westside Elementary School

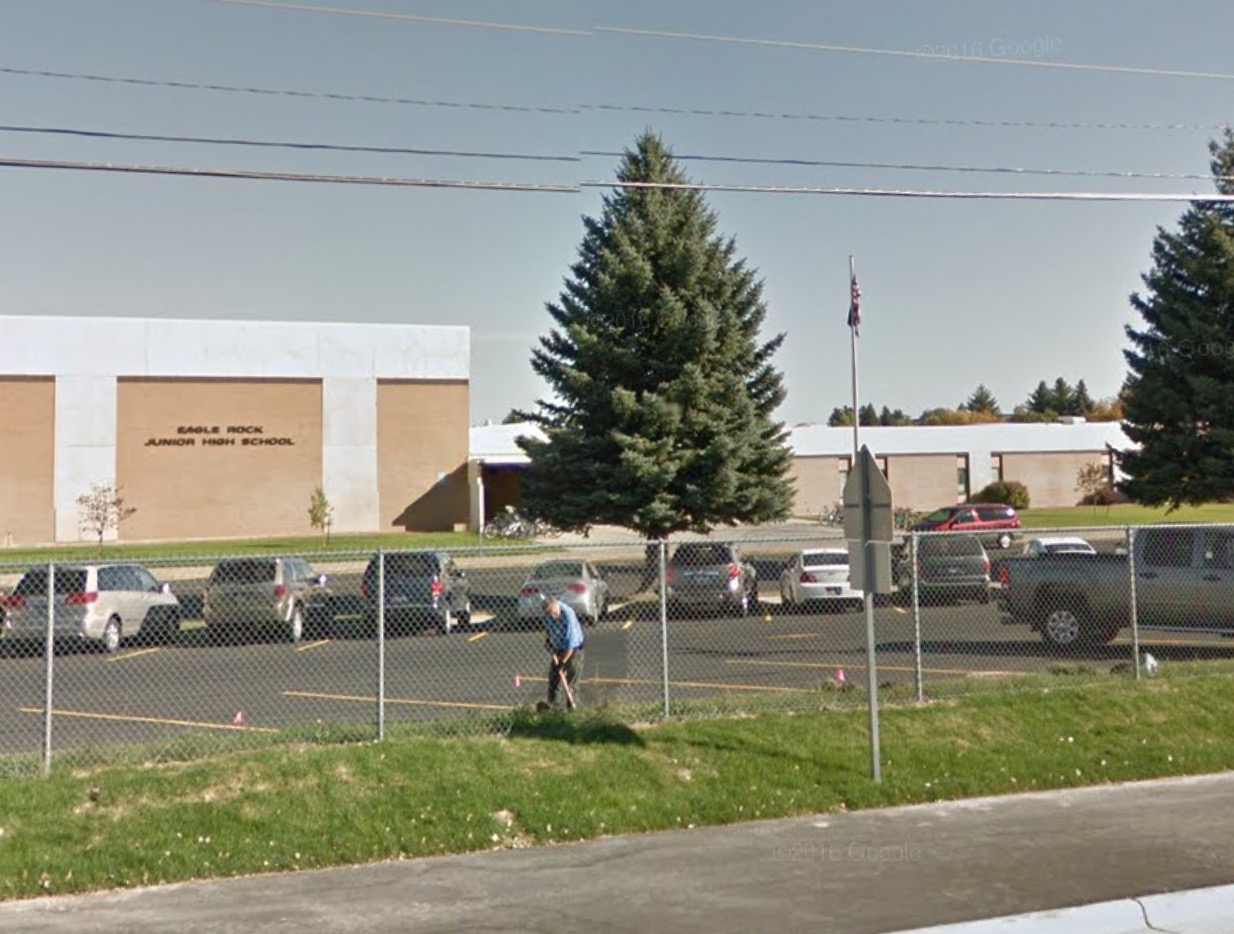
Eagle Rock Middle School

- Taylorview Middle School

Feeder Schools:
• Dora Erickson Elementary School
• Edgemont Elementary School
• Hawthorne Elementary School
• Linden Park Elementary School
• Longfellow Elementary School
• Sunnyside Elementary School
• Theresa Bunker Elementary School

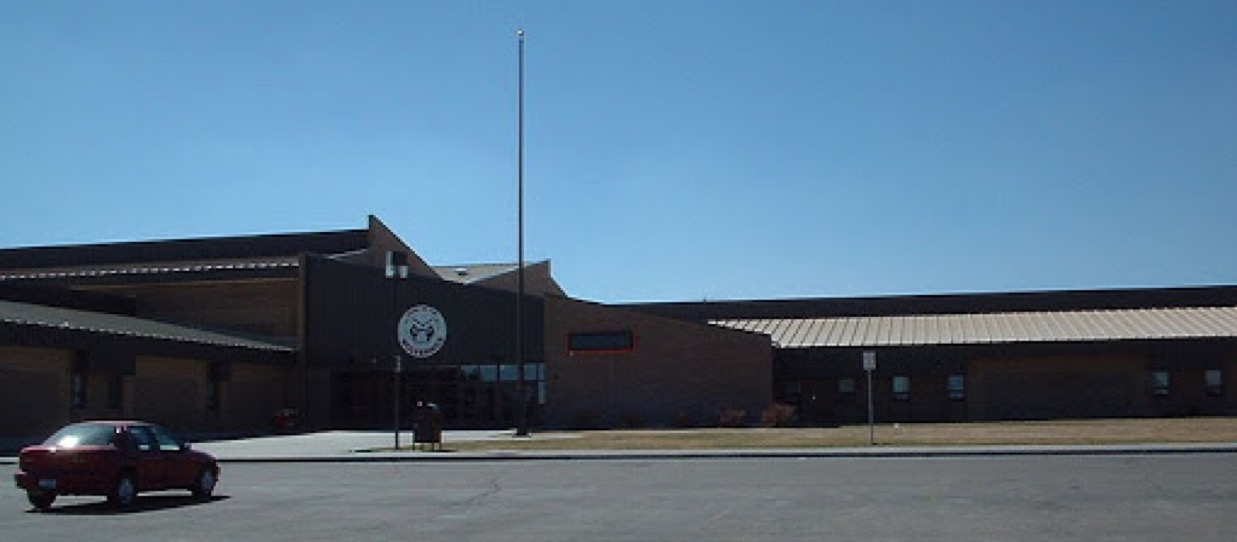
Taylorview Middle School

=== Elementary schools ===
- A.H. Bush Elementary School
- Dora Erickson Elementary School
- Edgemont Elementary School
- Ethel Boyes Elementary School
- Fox Hollow Elementary School
- Hawthorne Elementary School
- Linden Park Elementary School
- Longfellow Elementary School
- Sunnyside Elementary School
- Temple View Elementary School
- Theresa Bunker Elementary School
- Westside Elementary School

Each fall, the varsity football teams of Idaho Falls and Skyline High Schools compete in a rival football game called the Emotion Bowl, at Idaho Falls' Ravsten Stadium, which is shared by the two schools. The winning team and its fans traditionally paint the goalposts of the stadium in their school colors (orange for Idaho Falls High School, and blue for Skyline High School) after each Emotion Bowl.
