= Bill Evans (dancer) =

American dancer (born 1940)

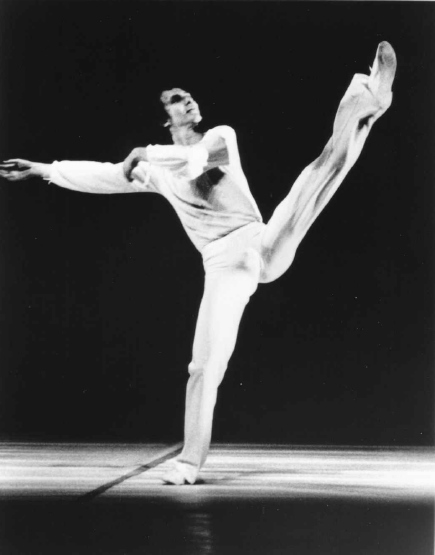
Bill Evans in Double Bill

James William Evans or Bill Evans (born 1940) is an American choreographer, performer, teacher, administrator, writer and movement analyst. He is professor emeritus of dance at the University of New Mexico and visiting professor emeritus at SUNY Brockport. He is also the founder and director of the Evans Somatic Dance Institute in Port Townsend, Washington. He founded the Bill Evans Dance Company in 1975 and the Bill Evans Summer Institute of Dance in 1977.

Evans's choreographic work has included more than 200 works for professional dance companies, including his own company, Repertory Dance Theatre, Ballet West, the Concert Dance Company of Boston, the Deutsche Oper Ballet in West Berlin, North Carolina Dance Theatre (now Charlotte Ballet), Pacific Northwest Ballet and Ririe-Woodbury Dance Company.

== Early life and education ==
Evans was born in Lehi, Utah. He studied with ballet teacher Willam Christensen and later attended the University of Utah, where he earned a bachelor's degree in English and ballet, graduating cum laude. He earned a Master of Fine Arts degree in modern dance from the University of Utah in 1970.

Evans performed with the University of Utah Theatre Ballet and Utah Civic Ballet and attaining the rank of principal dancer, and with Orcheses, the university’s modern dance performance ensemble. He also studied at Harkness House for Ballet Arts the Joffrey Ballet School in New York City.

== Career ==
Evans began his professional dance career in 1966 with the Briansky Ballet in New York. He subsequently danced with the Chicago Ballet and the Lyric Opera of Chicago and toured nationally with Ruth Page's Internation Ballet Company. In 1967 he joined Repertory Dance Theatre in Salt Lake City, where he worked as a dancer, choreographer, teacher and one of the company's artistic coordinators through 1974.

In 1970, Evans established the Bill Evans Solo Dance Repertory, through which he developed and performed solo modern-dance and rhythm-tap works. He formed the Bill Evans Dance Company in 1975. From 1983 to 1985, Evans served as artistic director, resident choreographer and company teacher of Winnipeg's Contemporary Dancers.

Evans was an assistant professor of modern dance at the University of Utah from 1974 to 1976 and a visiting professor at the University of Washington from 1978 to 1982. He became an associate professor and coordinator of contemporary dance at Indiana University Bloomington in 1986. In 1988, Evans joined the faculty of the University of New Mexico Department of Theatre and Dance, where he served as head of dance and later as a professor of dance. He was named Distinguished Professor Emeritus in 2004.

From 2004 through 2014, Evans was a visiting professor and guest artist at SUNY Brockport, where he also served as undergraduate program director. He was named Visiting Professor Emeritus in 2014. In 2021 he served as a visiting professor in the MFA program at Hollins University.

=== Evans Somatic Dance ===
Evans developed his modern dance teaching approach in the late 1960s, initially known as Evans Modern Dance Technique or Evans Laban-Based Modern Dance Technique. It draws on the Laban/Bartenieff Movement System, anatomy, kinesiology, and somatic education, and later became known as Evans Somatic Dance. In 2013, he founded the Somatic Dance Conference and Performance Festival. In 2017, he founded the Evans Somatic Dance Institute in Port Townsend.

== Choreography ==
Evans has choreographed more than 200 works, with later accounts placing the number at more than 250 and some institutional biographies at more than 300. His works have been performed by professional and university dance companies in the United States, Canada, Mexico and elsewhere.

Selected works include For Betty, When Summoned, The Legacy, Jukebox, Tin-Tal, Five Songs in August, Yes Indeed, Los Ritmos Calientes, Velorio, Together Through Time, Multiple Margaret, Alternating Current, Hard Times, Mixin' It Up, Cuttin' a Rug, Octet (for Jacquie), Crippled Up Blues and Other Tales of Deseret, Petroglyph and City of Dreams. His recent works include City of Dreams, created with composer Linda Dowdell and premiered in Port Townsend in 2023, and Grasslands, choreographed for the School of Contemporary Dancers in Winnipeg in 2024. In 2025, he presented On the Pulse of Morning, based on Maya Angelou's poem.

=== Tap dance ===
Evans founded the Bill Evans Rhythm Tap Ensemble in 1992 and has incorporated rhythm tap improvisation and repertory into his performances and teaching. In 2004, Dance Magazine readers selected him as one of three favorite American tap dancers, alongside Savion Glover and Brenda Bufalino.

== Publications ==
Evans has written on dance education, movement analysis, pedagogy and performance, with articles appearing in Dance Magazine, the Journal of Dance Education, Medical Problems of Performing Artists and Contact Quarterly.

His first book, Reminiscences of a Dancing Man: A Photographic Journey of a Life in Dance, was published by the National Dance Association in 2005. In 2023, Routledge published Teaching What You Want to Learn: A Guidebook for Dance and Movement Teachers.

== Archives ==
In 2023, Evans donated his professional archives to the University of Utah's J. Willard Marriott Library Special Collections. The collection documents approximately six decades of his work and includes correspondence, articles, reviews, programs, posters and teaching materials dating from 1956 to 2023.

== Awards and recognition ==
Evans received a Guggenheim Fellowship in choreography in 1976 and has received grants and fellowships from the National Endowment for the Arts and other arts organizations.

His other recognitions include the National Dance Association Scholar/Artist Award (1997), New Mexico Governor's Award for Excellence and Achievement in the Arts (2001), National Dance Education Organization Lifetime Achievement Award (2005), Dance Teacher Magazine Lifetime Achievement Award (2010), an honorary Doctor of Fine Arts degree from Cornish College of the Arts (2010), University of Utah Distinguished Alumni Award (2011), National High School Dance Festival Outstanding Service Award (2012), honorary membership in the International Association for Dance Medicine & Science (2013), Lifetime Achievement Award from the American Dance Guild (2014), Outstanding Dance Educator Award from the New York Dance Education Association (2014), Rhode Island State Council on the Arts fellowships (2016, 2018), and the Master Somatic Movement Educator designation from the International Somatic Movement Education and Therapy Association (2023).

In 2018, the Bill Evans 78! performance received the Dorry Award for Best Dance Performance from The Weekly Guide to What's Happening in Rhode Island.
