= Idaho Falls High School =

Location
- 601 South Holmes Avenue; Idaho Falls, Idaho 83401; United States; 43°29′33″N 112°01′23″W

Information
- Type: Public
- Established: 1897
- School district: Idaho Falls School District#91
- Principal: Dallan Parker
- Teaching staff: 67.15 (on a FTE basis)
- Grades: 9–12
- Enrollment: 1,298 (2024–2025)
- Student to teacher ratio: 20.48
- Colors: Orange and black
- Athletics: IHSAA Class 5A
- Athletics conference: High Country (5A)
- Nickname: Tigers
- Rival: Skyline High School
- Newspaper: IFHS Tiger Times
- Yearbook: The Spud Annual
- Elevation: 4,705 ft (1,434 m) AMSL
- Website: Idaho Falls High School

Idaho Falls High School (IFHS) is a four-year public secondary school in central Idaho Falls, Idaho, USA. The current building opened in 1952, though the school itself has been in operation since 1897. Idaho Falls is the older of the two traditional high schools, the other is Skyline, in the Idaho Falls School District#91. The school colors are orange and black and its teams are the Tigers; the mascot is known as "Sampson".

== History ==
As the oldest high school in Idaho Falls, IFHS was established in 1897. The first building was a three-story structure on the corner of North Water and Walnut Street, behind what later became O. E. Bell Junior High School. Following the construction of a larger building that occupied the entire block between 6th and 7th Streets and S. Boulevard and South Lee Avenue (where the Wesley W. Deist Aquatic Center is presently located), the original school building became the school district administration building and was also used for overflow classrooms as part of O.E. Bell Jr. High. It was later razed and is now part of the parking lot behind the present O.E. Bell office building.

When the current campus on South Holmes Avenue opened in 1952, the building on 7th Street became Central Junior High School, which burned down on 24 April 1973. The Civic Auditorium was concurrently constructed by the city in 1952, adjacent to the then-new Idaho Falls High School, and remains a major center for performing arts in the area. The school newspaper is the Tiger Times and the yearbook is The Spud Annual. Paul Haack wrote the school song. "Dear Old I.F. High", in 1927.

The school district added the freshman class to the high schools in August 2012.

== Demographics ==
The demographic breakdown of the 1,298 students in 2024–2025 was:

- Male - 51.2%
- Female - 48.7%
- Native American/Alaskan - 0.3%
- Asian/Pacific islanders - 0.6%
- Black - 0.3%
- Hispanic - 18.6%
- White - 74.7%
- Multiracial - 5.2%

30.8% of the students were eligible for free or reduced price lunch.

== Athletics ==
Idaho Falls competes in athletics in Idaho High School Activities Association Class 5A. It is currently a member of the High Country Conference (5A).

=== State titles ===
Boys

- American football (4): fall (A-1 Div II, now 5A) 1987, 1988, 1990, 1991 (official with introduction of playoffs, fall 1979)
  - (unofficial poll titles - 0) (poll introduced in 1963, through 1978)
- Cross country (8): fall 1995, 1996, 2002, 2017, 2018, 2019, 2021, 2023. (introduced in 1964)
- Basketball (9): 1931, 1932, 1951, 1952, 1953, 1960, 1961, 1988, 2019
- Wrestling (4): 1997, 1998, 2006, 2009 (introduced in 1958)
- Baseball (1): 2002 (records not kept by IHSAA, state tourney introduced in 1971)
- Track (3): 1927, 1943, 1967
- Golf (2): 1968, 2006 (introduced in 1956)
- Tennis (1): 2001 (combined team until 2008)

Girls

- Volleyball (6): fall 2003, 2004, 2005, 2011, 2014, 2015 (introduced in 1976)
- Tennis (2): 2011, 2012 (combined team until 2008)

Combined

- Tennis (2): 1990, 2001 (introduced in 1963, combined until 2008)

== Notable alumni ==
- Chris Appelhans, filmmaker and illustrator; wrote and directed of Wish Dragon (2021), co-wrote and co-directed of KPop Demon Hunters (2025)
- Bethine Clark Church - wife of Senator Frank Church (attended until mid-senior year, graduated from Boise High School), class of 1941
- D. Worth Clark - U.S. senator (1939–45) and congressman (1935–39) from Idaho,
- Mike Crapo - U.S. senator from Idaho (1999–present), class of 1969
- Jared Gold - fashion designer, appeared on America's Next Top Model
- Gregg Hale - guitar player for the multi-platinum selling British band Spiritualized, class of 1995.
- Roland Minson - former basketball player.
- Yo Murphy - former NFL wide receiver, played integral role for St. Louis Rams in Super Bowl XXXIV, class of 1989
- Ryan Nelson - federal judge, U.S. Court of Appeals for the Ninth Circuit (2018–present), class of 1991
- Thomas Nelson - federal judge, U.S. Court of Appeals for the Ninth Circuit (1990–2009), class of 1955
- Todd Pedersen - entrepreneur who founded Vivint and VivintSolar, class of 1987
- Mel Peterson - former NBA player
- Brandi Sherwood - model and actor who became Miss Teen USA, Miss Idaho USA and Miss USA, class of 1989
- Jesse Walters - former justice of the Idaho Supreme Court, former chief judge of the Idaho Court of Appeals, class of 1957
- Rachel Martin - journalist and co-host of NPR's Morning Edition, class of 1992

== Gallery ==
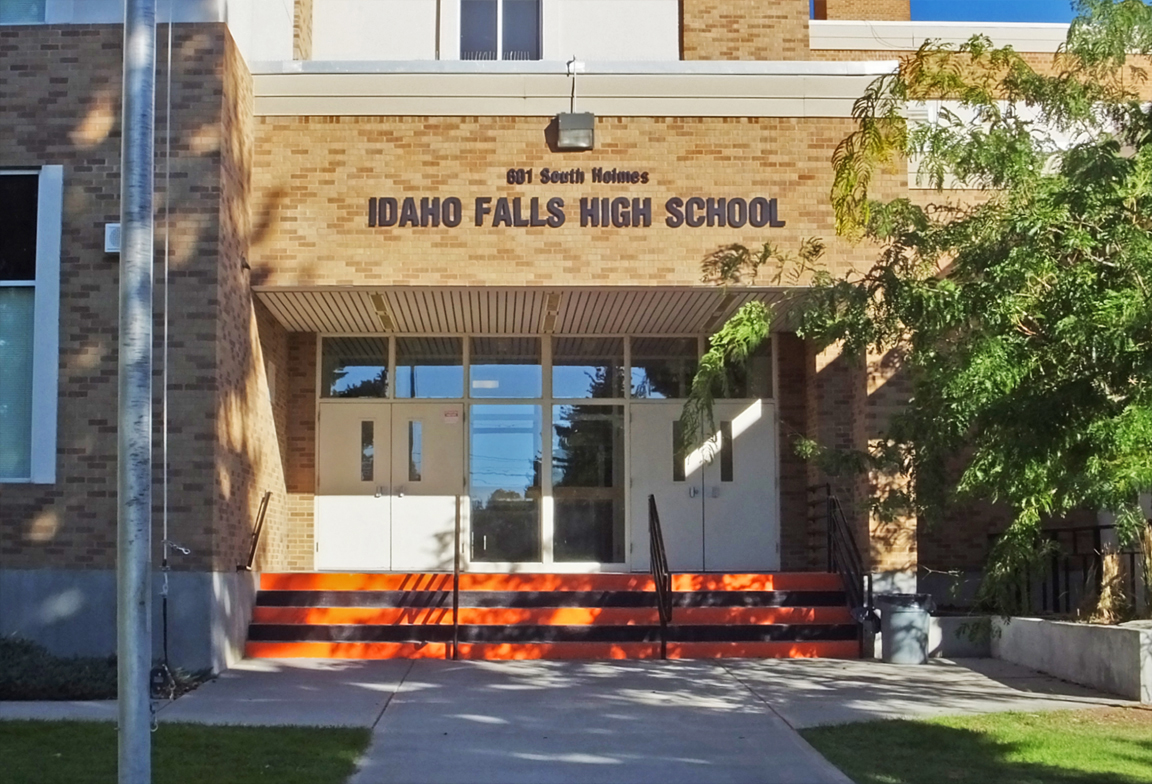
Idaho Falls High School

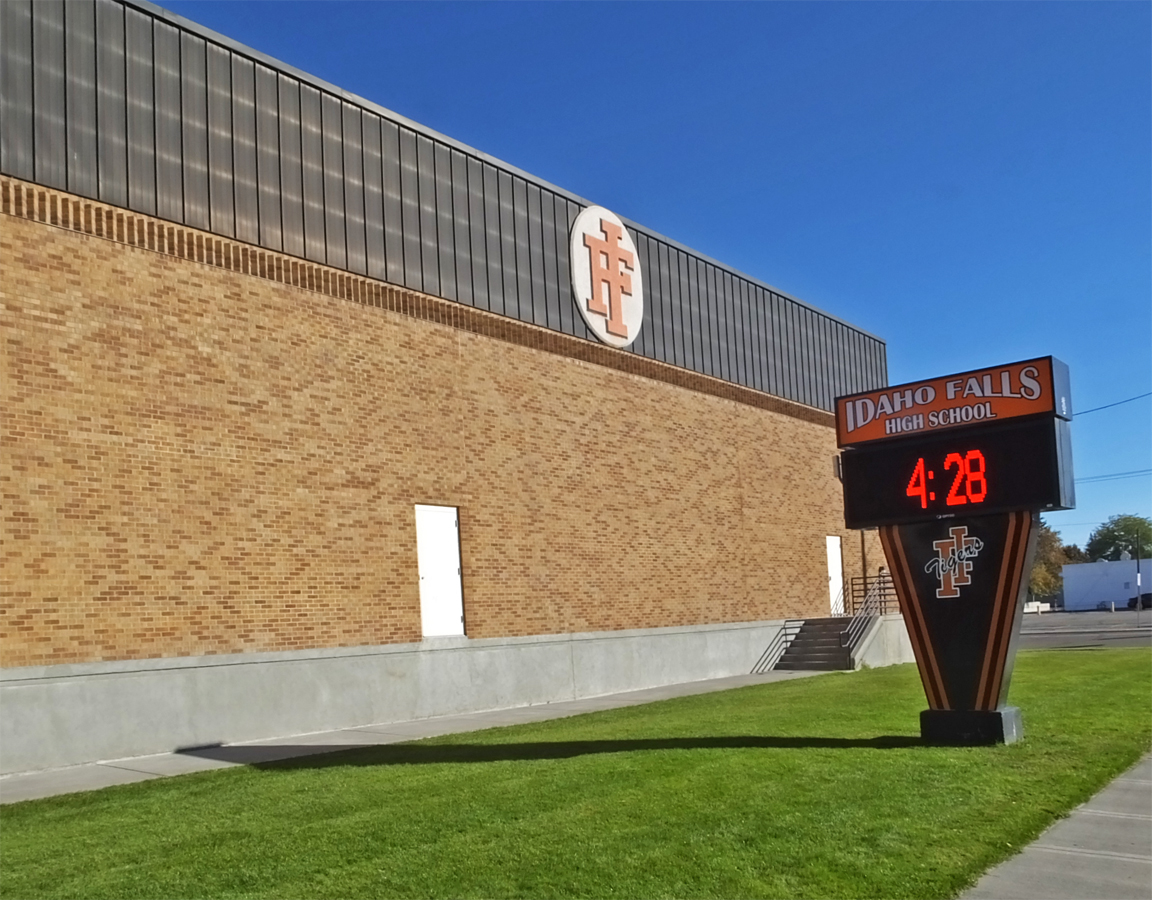
Idaho Falls High School sign

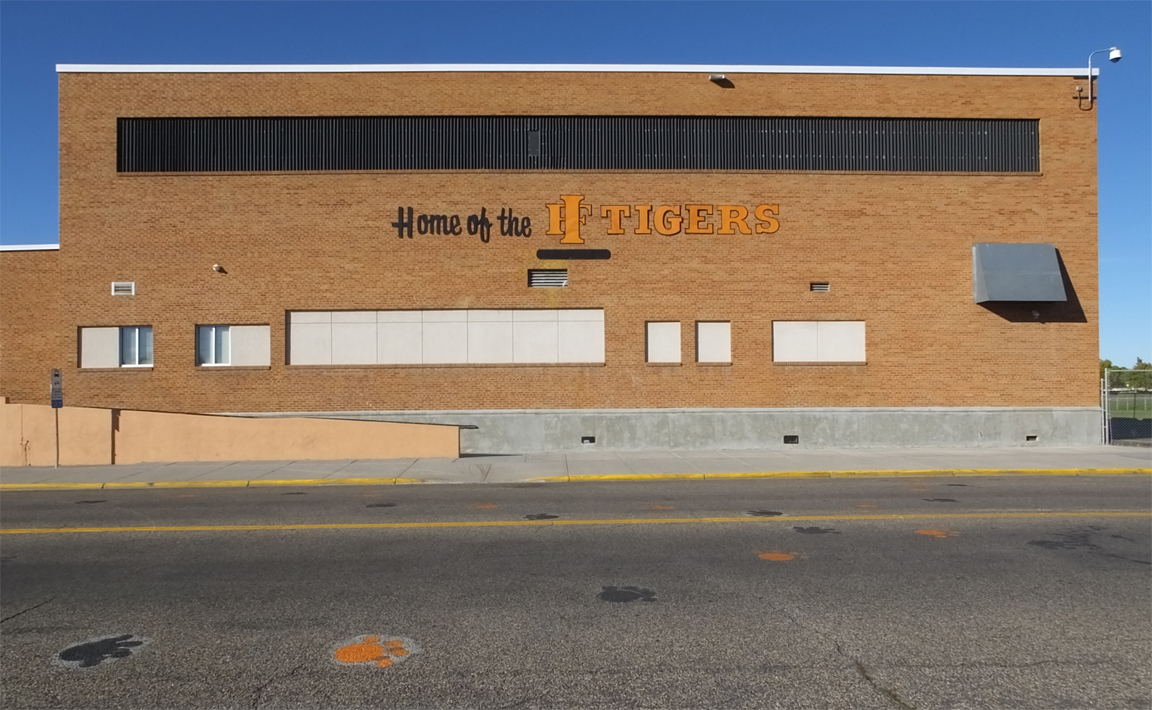
Idaho Falls High School side view

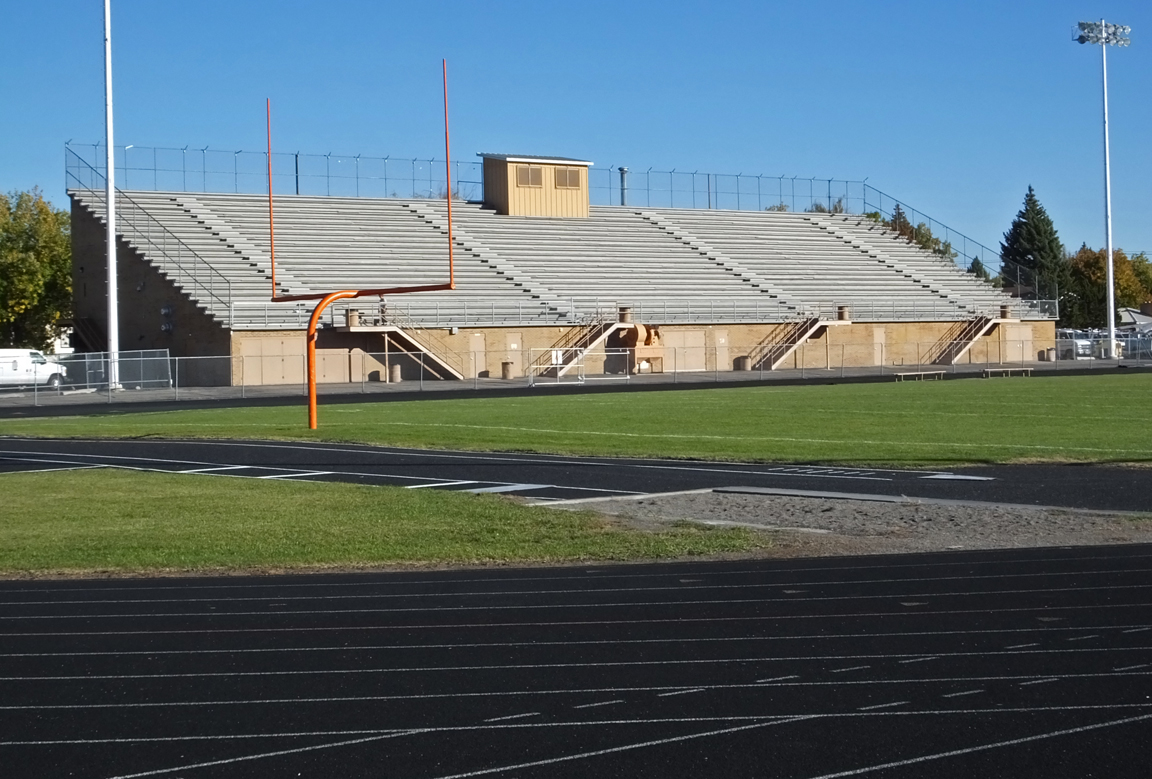
A view of Ravston Stadium- Idaho Falls' home field - in 2013

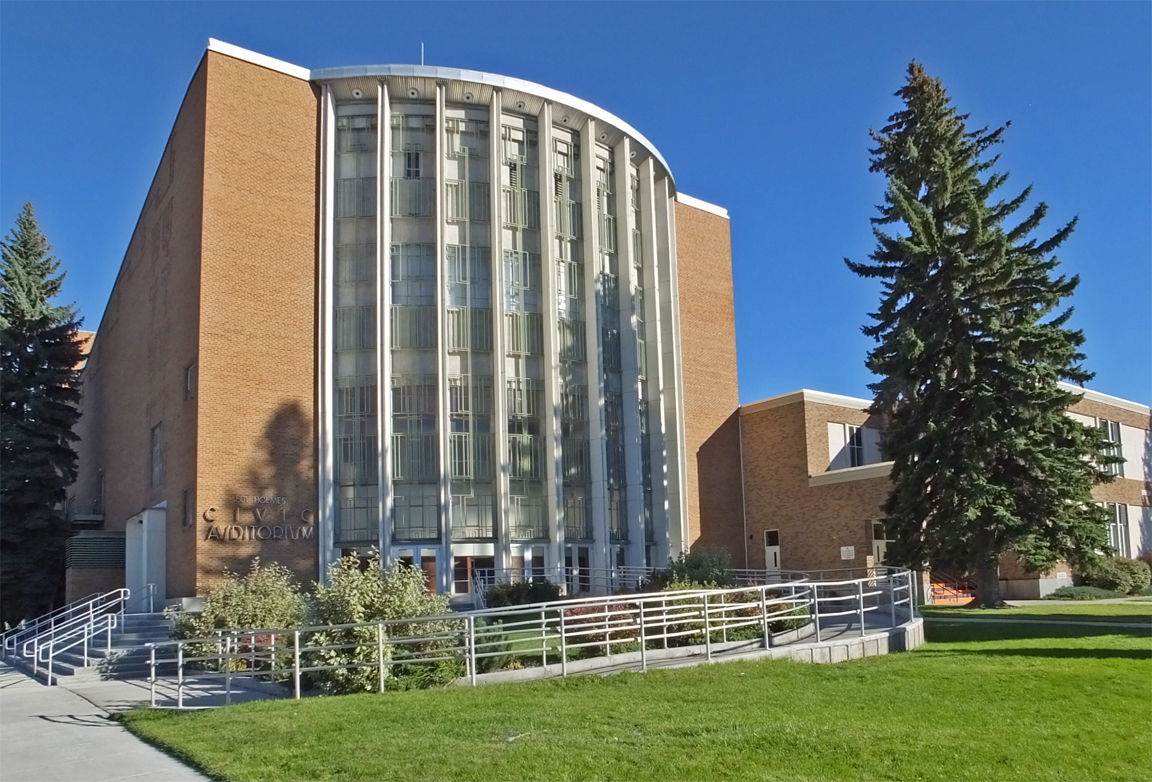
Idaho Falls Civic Auditorium
