= Solar Energy Industries Association =

American non-profit

- Formation: January 24, 1974; 52 years ago
- Legal status: Industry association
- Purpose: National industry association of the U.S. solar industry
- Headquarters: Washington, D.C., United States
- President and CEO: Tim Pawlenty
- Website: www.seia.org

The Solar Energy Industries Association (SEIA), established in 1974, is the American national non-profit trade association of the solar-energy industry in the United States. In 2025, the group reported at least 1,200 member companies.

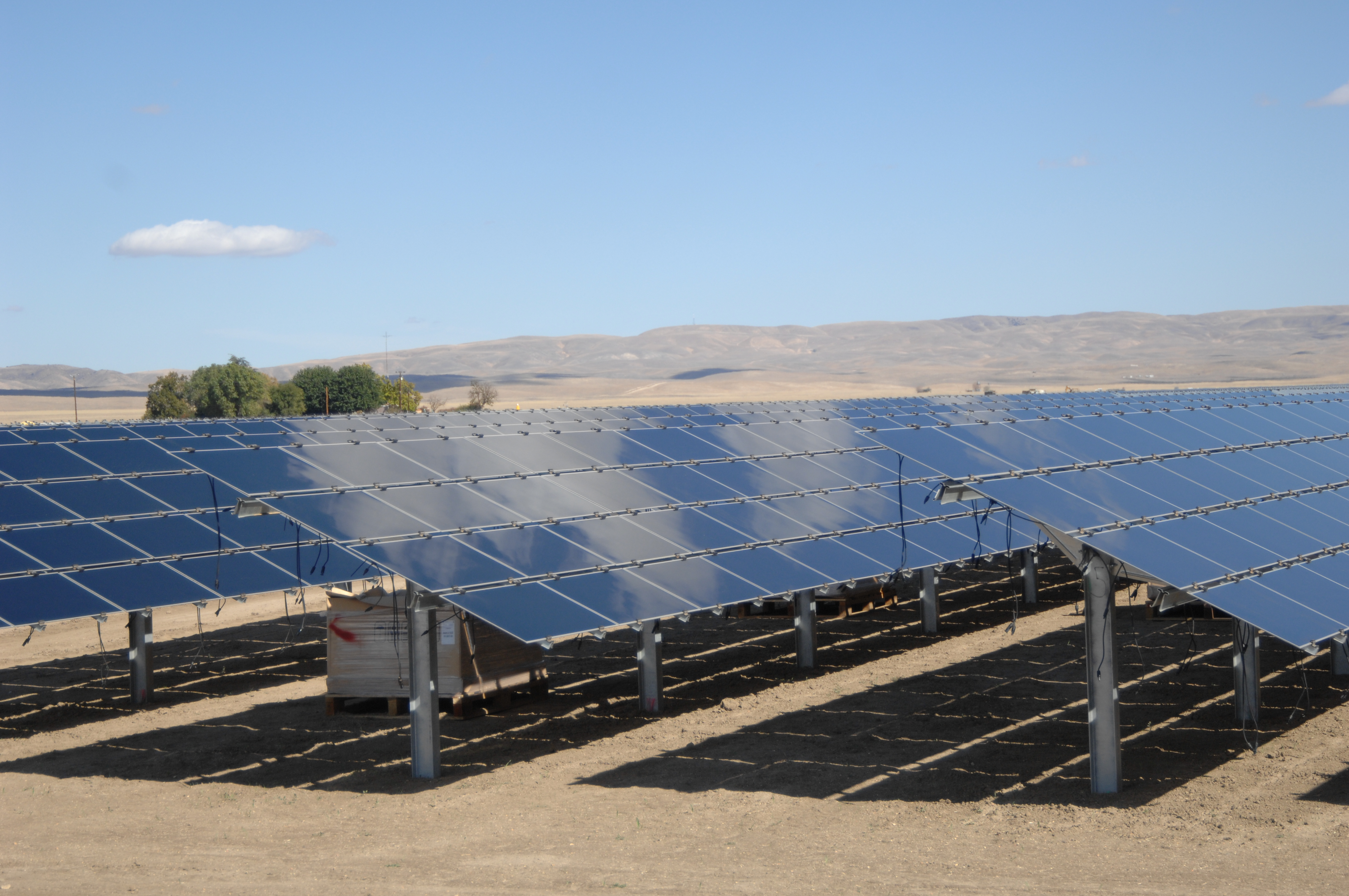
Utility-scale solar photovoltaic (plant) in Sacramento, CA

SEIA is a 501(c)(6) nonprofit trade association. The association supports the extension of a 30 percent federal solar investment tax credit for eight years.

With the recent high flux of green jobs in the solar industry, SEIA maintains a resource for those looking for solar jobs. The Harvard Business Review claims that the solar industry could absorb all of the jobs lost to the coal industry as it shutters. By 2016, according to the U.S. Department of Energy, the solar industry employed more workers in the energy generation industry than all fossil fuels (oil, coal, and natural gas) combined.

An independent but strategically aligned organization, the Solar Foundation, is a 501(c)3 non-profit organization which develops education and outreach programs to promote the further development of solar energy in the U.S.

== Official state affiliates ==
- Arizona Solar Energy Industries Association – AriSEIA
- Arkansas Advanced Energy Association – AAEA
- Chesapeake Solar and Storage Association – CHESSA
- Colorado Solar & Storage Association – COSSA
- Florida Solar Energy Industries Association – FlaSEIA
- Georgia Solar Energy Industries Association – Georgia SEIA
- Green Energy Ohio
- Gulf States Renewable Energy Industries Association
- Illinois Solar Energy & Storage Association – ISEA
- Iowa Solar Energy Trade Association – ISETA
- Kentucky Solar Energy Industries Association – KYSEIA
- Minnesota Solar Energy Industries Association – MnSEIA
- Missouri Solar Energy Industries Association – MOSEIA
- New York Solar Energy Industries Association – NYSEIA
- Renewable Energy Vermont
- Renew Wisconsin
- Oregon Solar + Storage Industries Association – OSSIA
- Tennessee Solar Energy Industries Association – TenneSEIA
- Washington Solar Energy Industries Association – WASEIA

== See also ==
- Solar Power International
