= Virginia Tanner =

American dance instructor

Virginia Tanner (April 25, 1915 – May 20, 1979) was an American dance instructor and founder of the University of Utah Children's Dance Theatre. Born in Salt Lake City, Utah, she began her formal dance training at the University of Utah. She studied with Doris Humphrey in New York City before returning to Salt Lake City in the early 1940s to establish her school for creative dance for children.

== Biography ==
Virginia Tanner began teaching children at the McCune School of Music and Art in Salt Lake City in 1941, where she was director of the dance program. She went on to establish her own school within the University of Utah's continuing education program, which survives today under the direction of Mary Ann Lee as an auxiliary of the College of Fine Arts at the University of Utah. In 1943, she formed the Modern Dance Theatre, a company that she co-directed with local dancer Barry Lynn. In 1949, she formed the Children's Dance Theatre.

In 1953, the Children's Dance Theatre performed at the Jacob's Pillow Dance Theatre in Massachusetts, the American Dance Festival in Connecticut, and New York University's summer camp in upstate New York to critical acclaim. Following the 1953 performances, the Children's Dance Theatre performed throughout the United States, including the Seattle World's Fair in 1962 and the John F. Kennedy Center in Washington, D.C., in 1975. Tanner and her students were featured in Life, Newsweek and Dance Magazine and on national television.

In 1960, Tanner was instrumental in gaining a grant from the Rockefeller Foundation to bring great choreographers to Salt Lake City to set work on dancers at the University of Utah. In 1966, through her efforts, a larger grant from the Foundation was awarded to the university to establish the Utah Repertory Dance Theatre.

Tanner taught extensively throughout the United States through the National Endowment for the Arts' Artist-in-the-School program. She was a contributing author to the Self-Expression and Conduct – The Humanities book series, published by Harcourt Brace Jovanovich in the 1970s.

Celebrated dancer and choreographer José Limón said of Tanner in 1978, "Salt Lake City is the most blessed city in the world to have the world's master children's dance teacher. There isn't any place, and I include New York, London, Paris, Moscow, that has anyone who can touch her genius for teaching children the exciting purity of the dancing arts." John Kerr, NEA Director of Education, called Tanner the nation's "outstanding children's dance teacher," noting that "she combines the techniques and training of the professional dancer with a marvelous and rare understanding of how to teach and inspire children."

Tanner is the recipient of numerous awards, including an honorary Doctorate of Fine Arts from the University of Utah and a Plaudit award for inspired teaching from the National Dance Association.

Virginia Tanner died on May 20, 1979. The creative dance program she founded in 1949 continues to thrive and expand, sharing the methods of dance instruction that she pioneered.

== Virginia Tanner Creative Dance Program ==
The Virginia Tanner Creative Dance Program, also known simply as Tanner Dance, was founded and directed by Virginia Tanner until her death in 1979. It has since continued to grow as an auxiliary of the College of Fine Arts at the University of Utah under the direction of Mary Ann Lee. In addition to the Children's Dance Theatre, its constituent programs now include a Fine Arts Preschool, an Arts in Education program providing weekly dance classes at elementary schools along the Wasatch Front, classes for dancers with disabilities, and professional development programs that train educators in the integration of arts in the classroom. In 2014, Tanner Dance relocated to new headquarters in the 110,000-square-foot Beverley Taylor Sorenson Arts and Education Complex on the University of Utah campus. The program now serves about 5,000 students every week, including 4,000 students in site-based programs at elementary schools and another 1,000 dance students at the new complex.

=== University of Utah Children's Dance Theatre ===
Children's Dance Theatre (CDT), the performing arm of Tanner Dance, was founded by Virginia Tanner in 1949 and remains an integral component of the University of Utah's Creative Dance Program. It is the second-oldest performing arts organization in Utah.

CDT's first formal concert, held in May 1949 at Kingsbury Hall, was attended by Doris Humphrey, whose reaction was effusive: "Your children have left an indelible impression with me of true creative dance... Your children offer a wonderful proof of the power of the young artist, guided wisely, untarnished by dogma or routine, unstereotyped, and lovely. This source of fresh ideas in dance–art is a treasure house to which you have found the key." Humphrey worked to help secure invitations for CDT to perform in the eastern US; CDT's subsequent performances at Jacob's Pillow in Massachusetts, the American Dance Festival in Connecticut, and the 1962 Seattle World's Fair received national media coverage and wide acclaim.

Today the company of 280 young dancers, ages 8 through 18, performs for more than 30,000 Utahns annually. Every spring, CDT showcases an original work at the Capitol Theatre in Salt Lake City with matinees for school-age children and special populations.

Major performances of Children's Dance Theatre:

- 1952 Christmas in the Air
- 1953 Jacob's Pillow
- 1960 Jacob's Pillow; American Theatre Conference, New York City
- 1960 Tour to Connecticut College School of Dance, New London, Connecticut
- 1961 Cranberry Corners
- 1961 My Favorite Things
- 1962 Seattle World's Fair, Seattle, Washington
- 1964 Scrooge: The Stingiest Man in the World
- 1964 Snow Queen
- 1964 Ceremony of Carols
- 1968 Tour to Hawaii
- 1970 White House Conference on Children, Washington, D.C.
- 1975 Kennedy Center, Washington, D.C.
- 1978 Dance and the Child Conference, Edmonton, Alberta, Canada
- 1978 Stonecutter
- 1978 Tribute to Virginia Tanner, Capitol Theatre, Salt Lake City
- 1980 Rainbow Goblins, Capitol Theatre
- 1981 Pierrot
- 1981–83 Children's Dance Theatre in Concert, Kingsbury Hall, Salt Lake City
- 1984 Desert Landscapes, Kingsbury Hall, Salt Lake City
- 1985 I Am Magic, Kingsbury Hall, Salt Lake City
- 1985 International Children's Festival, Wolf Trap Farm Park, Washington, D.C.
- 1986 Stanford University, Stanford, California
- 1986 International Children's Festival, Wolf Trap Farm Park, Washington, D.C.
- 1986 The Dancing Man, Capitol Theatre
- 1987 The Dancing Man, Capitol Theatre
- 1988 Anna & The Echo Catcher, Capitol Theatre
- 1988 Dance and the Child International Conference, London, England
- 1989 40th Anniversary Concert, Capitol Theatre
- 1989 Together
- 1990 Anna & The Echo Catcher, Capitol Theatre
- 1991 Dance and the Child International Conference, Salt Lake City
- 1991 Young She & Grandmother Tree, Capitol Theatre
- 1992 100 Years of Dance, American Dance Festival West, Salt Lake City
- 1992 Tales, Capitol Theatre
- 1993 Dance & Sing, featuring Pete Seeger, Capitol Theatre
- 1993 Shout, Abravanel Hall, Governor's Awards in the Arts, Salt Lake City
- 1994 TARI International Conference and Dance Festival, Kuala Lumpur
- 1994 Visions of Children featuring Pete Seeger, Capitol Theatre (Note: 45th Anniversary Concert)
- 1995 The Rag Coat, Capitol Theatre
- 1996 Waking the West, Kingsbury Hall, Salt Lake City
- 1997 Dance and the Child International Conference, Kuopio, Finland
- 1997 Salt, Capitol Theatre
- 1998 The Joy Keeper, Ogden Egyptian Theatre, Ogden, Utah
- 1998 The Joy Keeper, Capitol Theatre
- 1998 Wales Dance Exchange, Cardiff, Wales
- 1999 ... and We Began to Dance, Salt Lake City (Note: 50th Anniversary Concert)
- 1999 SLOC Olympic Mascot Unveiling
- 2000 The Quiltmaker's Gift, Capitol Theatre
- 2001 Crumb and the Pirates, Capitol Theatre
- 2002 RePETE, Capitol Theatre
- 2003 Sense Pass King, Capitol Theatre
- 2004 The Three Questions, Capitol Theatre
- 2005 Pockets, Capitol Theatre
- 2006 A Blue So Blue, Capitol Theatre
- 2007 The Dream Stealer, Capitol Theatre
- 2008 Scientia, Capitol Theatre
- 2009 Coming Home, Capitol Theatre (Note: 60th Anniversary Concert)
- 2010 True North, Capitol Theatre
- 2011 Alice Through the Looking-Glass, Capitol Theatre
- 2012 The Apple-Pip Princess, Capitol Theatre
- 2013 The Snow Queen, Capitol Theatre
- 2014 The Three Questions 2014, Capitol Theatre
- 2015 Crumb and the Pirates 2015, Capitol Theatre
- 2016 Gwinna, Capitol Theatre
- 2017 Elfwyn's Saga, Capitol Theatre
- 2018 The Magic Lake, Capitol Theatre
- 2019 The Dancing Man, Capitol Theatre

Notable dancers and choreographers from Children's Dance Theatre have included: Cynthia Pepper (Bay Area choreographer and filmmaker), Jacque Bell (choreographer, Alexander Technique instructor, movement instructor in the Department of Theatre at the University of Utah), Linda Smith (artistic director of Utah Repertory Dance Theatre), Lisa Warenski (philosopher, former dancer and choreographer), Lola Huth (danced with José Limón company), Mimi Silverstein (former Repertory Dance Theatre member), Tina Misaka (former Repertory Dance Theatre member), and Chara Huckins (former Repertory Dance Theatre member).

== Repertory Dance Theatre ==
Utah Repertory Dance Theatre, founded in 1966 with Virginia Tanner's help, is still in existence and is one of the oldest and most successful modern dance companies of its kind.

Notable alumni of Repertory Dance Theatre include: Linda Smith (current artistic director), Bill Evans, Douglas Boulivar, Gregg Lizenbery, Joan Moon, Rick Rowsell, Karen Steele (danced with Lar Lubovitch after RDT), Kathleen McClintock, Kay Clark (artistic director of RDT with Linda Smith 1977–1983), Lynne Wimmer, Manzell Senters, Martin Kravitz (danced with Batsheva Dance Company after RDT), Ron Rubey, Tim Wengerd (principal dancer with Martha Graham until his death in 1986), and Joel Kirby (vocalist and film actor).
