= Lisa Warenski =

Lisa Warenski is a former Salt Lake City-based dancer and choreographer who received her early training at the Virginia Tanner School for Creative Dance, where she was a member of the Children's Dance Theatre and studied with members of the Utah Repertory Dance Theatre.

== Choreographer ==
She taught in numerous dance programs and schools in Utah, Massachusetts and New York, including the Tanner School in Salt Lake City and the 92nd Street Y Dance Department in New York City; choreographed and performed extensively in Salt Lake City; her significant choreographic works include Fear of..., made on TJ Rizzo and Nancy Welti, and In the Shadow of Time (The Etudes).

The Etudes was set on members of the Children's Dance Theatre and Mimi Silverstein; she and Rizzo both became members of Utah Repertory Dance Theatre shortly after they appeared in Warenski's Etudes and Fear of..., respectively.

The Etudes were performed at the first annual conference for children's dance in Edmonton, Alberta, Canada, as well as at the Virginia Tanner Tribute Concert.

== See also ==
- Virginia Tanner
- Repertory Dance Theatre
