= Lehi, Utah =

City in Utah, United States

- City
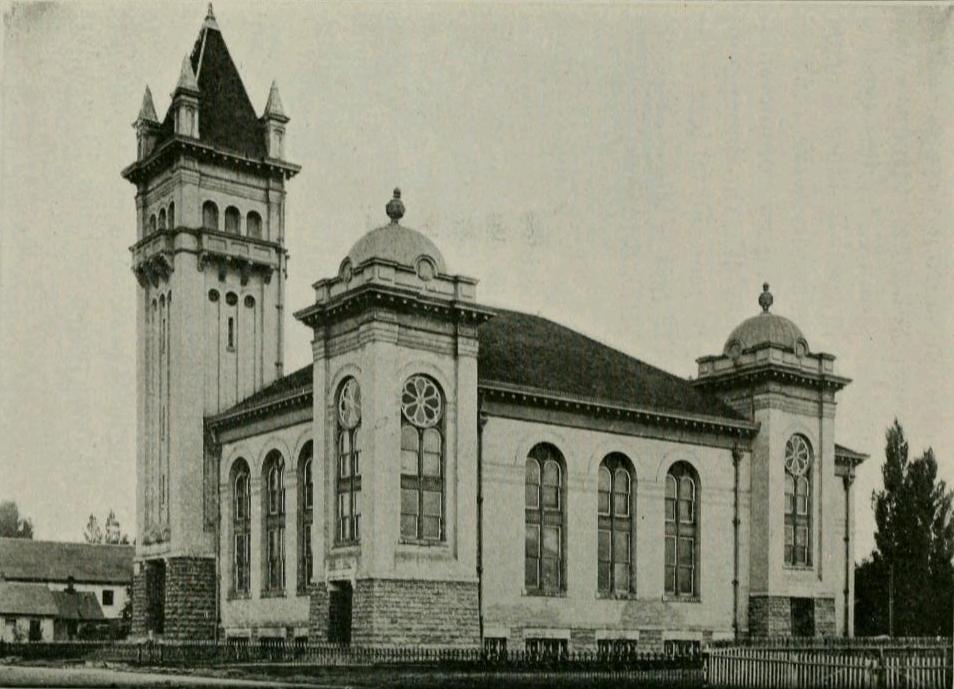
- Lehi Tabernacle in 1913

- Location in Utah County and the state of Utah
- Coordinates: 40°23′16″N 111°52′18″W
- Country: United States
- State: Utah
- County: Utah
- Settled: 1850
- Incorporated: February 5, 1852
- Named for: Lehi

Area
  - Total: 28.45 sq mi (73.69 km^{2})
  - Land: 28.09 sq mi (72.74 km^{2})
  - Water: 0.36 sq mi (0.94 km^{2})
- Elevation: 4,561 ft (1,390 m)

Population (2020)
  - Total: 75,907
  - Density: 2,702.3/sq mi (1,043.4/km^{2})
- Time zone: UTC−7 (Mountain (MST))
  - Summer (DST): UTC−6 (MDT)
- ZIP code: 84043, 84048
- Area codes: 385, 801
- FIPS code: 49-44320
- GNIS feature ID: 2410816
- Website: www.lehi-ut.gov

Lehi (/ˈliːhaɪ/ LEE-hy) is a city in Utah County, Utah, United States. The population was 75,907 at the 2020 census, up from 47,407 in 2010, and it is the center of population of Utah. The rapid growth in Lehi is due, in part, to the rapid development of the tech industry region known as Silicon Slopes.

== History ==
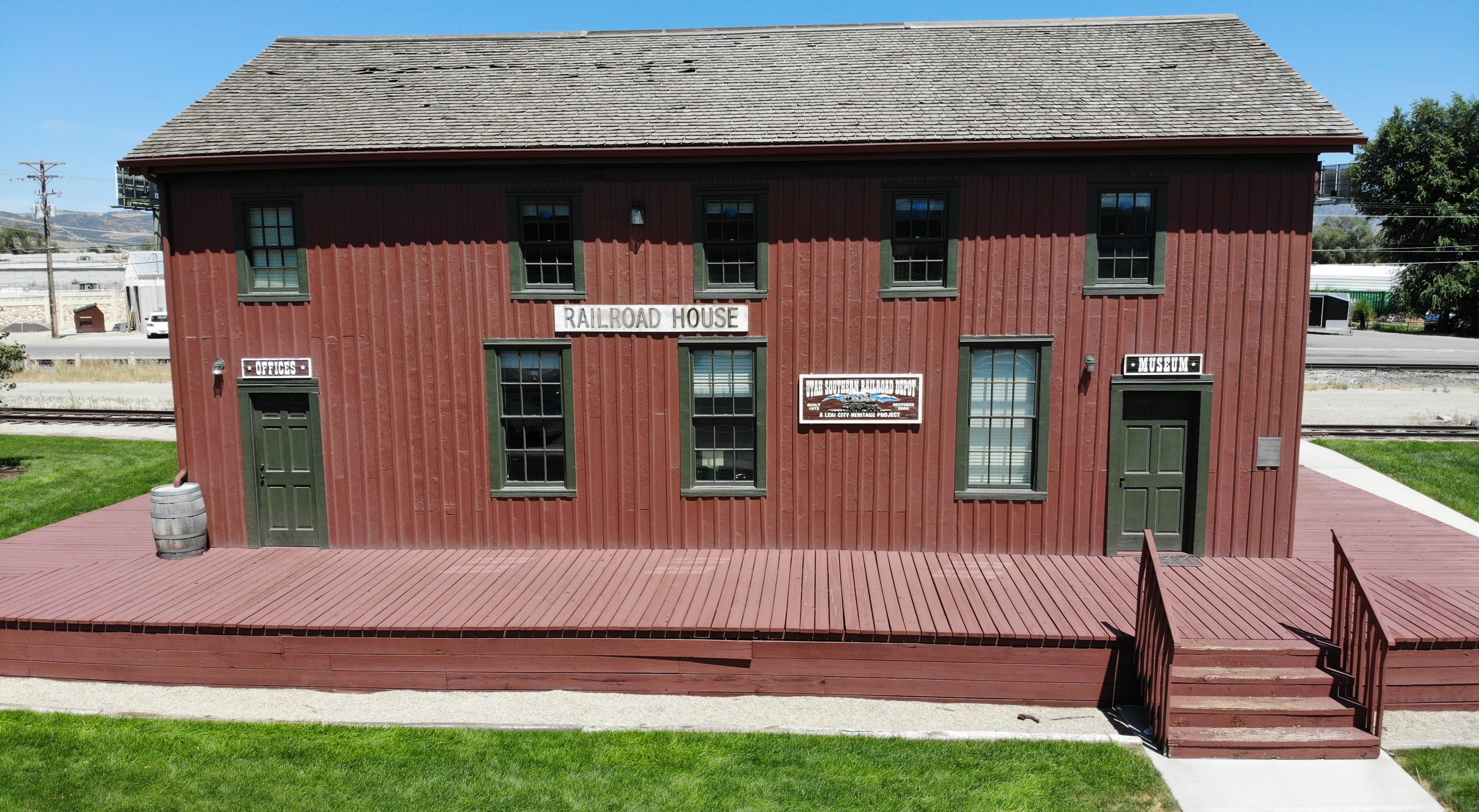
Historic train station (2019)

A group of Mormon pioneers settled the area now known as Lehi in the fall of 1850 at a place called Dry Creek in the northernmost part of Utah Valley. It was renamed Evansville in 1851 after David Evans, a local bishop in the Church of Jesus Christ of Latter-day Saints. Other historical names include Sulphur Springs and Snow's Springs.

The settlement grew so rapidly that, in early 1852, Bishop Evans petitioned the Utah Territorial Legislature to incorporate the settlement. Lehi City was incorporated by legislative act on February 5, 1852. It was the sixth city incorporated in Utah. The legislature also approved a request to call the new city Lehi, after a Book of Mormon prophet of the same name. The first mayor of Lehi was Silas P. Barnes, from 1853 to 1854.

The downtown area has been designated the Lehi Main Street Historic District by the National Park Service and is on the National Register of Historic Places.

== Geography ==
According to the United States Census Bureau, the city has a total area of 26.7 square miles (69.1 km^{2}) of which 26.3 square miles (68.2 km^{2}) is land and 0.35 square miles (0.9 km^{2}), or 1.28%, is water.

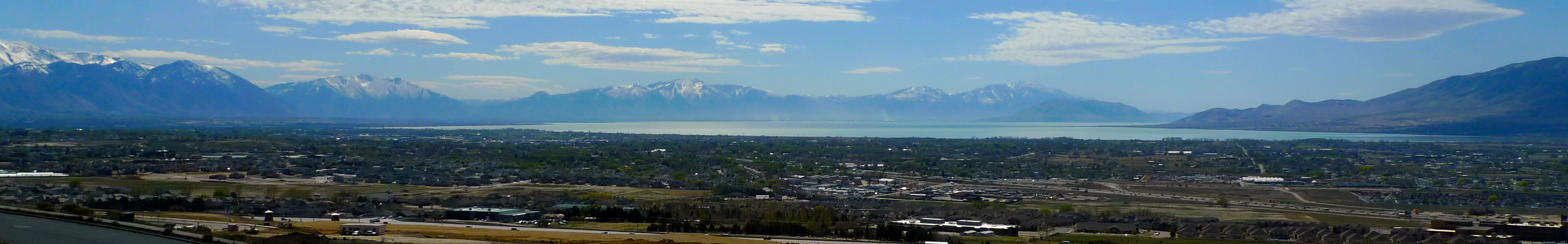
View from Traverse Mountain

=== Climate ===
Climate data for Lehi, Utah
Month	Jan	Feb	Mar	Apr	May	Jun	Jul	Aug	Sep	Oct	Nov	Dec	Year
Mean daily maximum °F (°C)	37 (3)	43 (6)	52 (11)	61 (16)	72 (22)	82 (28)	90 (32)	88 (31)	79 (26)	64 (18)	48 (9)	39 (4)	63 (17)
Mean daily minimum °F (°C)	16 (−9)	19 (−7)	28 (−2)	34 (1)	41 (5)	48 (9)	55 (13)	54 (12)	45 (7)	34 (1)	25 (−4)	18 (−8)	35 (2)
Average precipitation inches (mm)	0.98 (24.9)	1.00 (25.4)	1.12 (28.4)	1.3 (33)	1.40 (35.6)	0.66 (16.8)	0.7 (17)	0.98 (24.9)	1.15 (29.2)	1.33 (33.8)	1.13 (28.7)	0.69 (17.5)	12.44 (315.2)
Source: weather.com

== Demographics ==
Historical population
Census	Pop.	Note	%±
1890	1,907		—
1900	3,033		59.0%
1910	3,344		10.3%
1920	3,078		−8.0%
1930	2,826		−8.2%
1940	2,733		−3.3%
1950	3,627		32.7%
1960	4,377		20.7%
1970	4,659		6.4%
1980	6,848		47.0%
1990	8,475		23.8%
2000	19,028		124.5%
2010	47,407		149.1%
2020	75,907		60.1%
2025 (est.)	95,313		25.6%
U.S. Decennial Census

Lehi is part of the Provo–Orem metropolitan area.

=== Racial and ethnic composition ===
Racial composition as of the 2020 census
Race	Number	Percent
White	64,481	84.9%
Black or African American	415	0.5%
American Indian and Alaska Native	358	0.5%
Asian	1,933	2.5%
Native Hawaiian and Other Pacific Islander	676	0.9%
Some other race	2,114	2.8%
Two or more races	5,930	7.8%
Hispanic or Latino (of any race)	6,583	8.7%

=== 2020 census ===
As of the 2020 census, Lehi had a population of 75,907, the median age was 26.2 years, 39.5% of residents were under the age of 18, and 5.8% of residents were 65 years of age or older. For every 100 females there were 101.5 males, and for every 100 females age 18 and over there were 99.1 males age 18 and over. There were 20,296 households in Lehi, of which 58.1% had children under the age of 18 living in them. Of all households, 73.3% were married-couple households, 10.4% were households with a male householder and no spouse or partner present, and 13.8% were households with a female householder and no spouse or partner present. About 11.1% of all households were made up of individuals and 3.4% had someone living alone who was 65 years of age or older. There were 20,994 housing units, of which 3.3% were vacant. The homeowner vacancy rate was 1.1% and the rental vacancy rate was 4.2%. 98.3% of residents lived in urban areas, while 1.7% lived in rural areas.

=== 2023 American Community Survey ===
As of the American Community Survey (ACS) Demographic and Housing Estimates of 2023, there were 90,229 people living in the city. The estimated racial makeup of the city was 81.7% European American, 0.5% African American, 0.2% Native American, 2.0% Asian, 1.5% Pacific Islander, 2.0% from other races, and 12.1% from two or more races. Hispanic or Latino of any race were 12.1% of the population. An estimated 50.2% of the population was male with 49.8% female. The median age as of 2023 was 26.6.

=== 2010 census ===
According to the 2010 Census, there were 12,402 households, out of which 61.0% had children under the age of 18 living with them, 78.4% were husband-wife families living together, 3.2% had a male householder with no wife present, 7.1% had a female householder with no husband present, and 11.3% were non-families. 9.0% of all households were made up of individuals (living alone) and 11.7% had someone living alone who was 65 years of age or older. The average household size was 3.81 and the average family size was 4.08.

=== 2018 income and employment estimates ===
As of 2018, the median income for a household in Lehi was $74,200, and the median income for a family was $88,278. The per capita income for the city was $25,894, including all adults and children. The unemployment rate for Lehi was 3.0%. The job growth rate was at 2.6% and was expected to grow 54.8% over the next 10 years.

== Economy ==
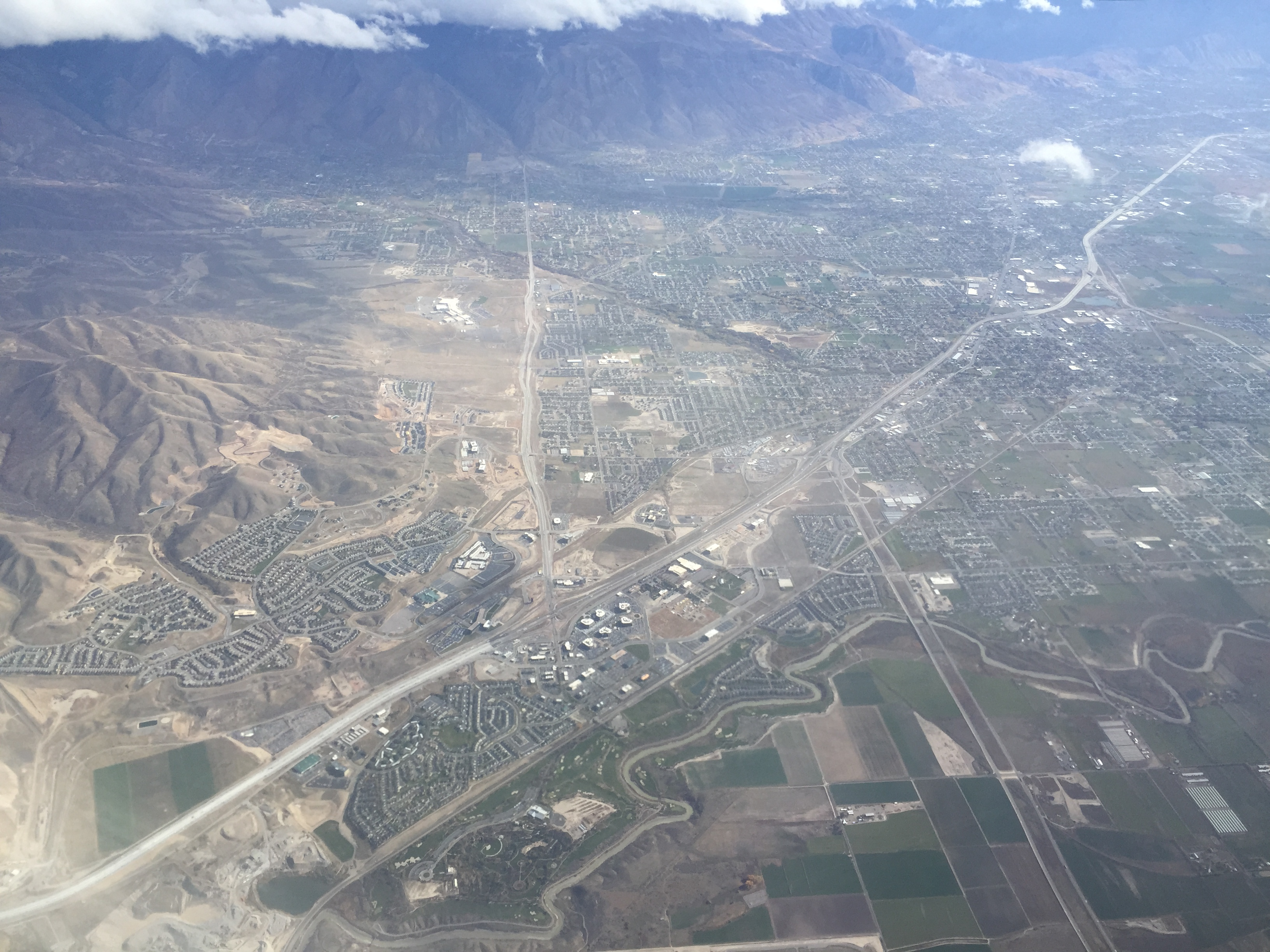
View of Lehi (foreground), American Fork (upper right) and Highland (upper left)

Lehi has been transitioning from an agricultural economy to a technological economy. This first started with the lengthy construction of a DRAM microchip plant by Micron Technology, which eventually evolved into a NAND flash memory business called IM Flash Technologies that was founded by both Micron and the Intel Corporation with headquarters in Lehi. In 2013, 1 out of every 14 flash memory chips in the world was produced in Lehi. On June 30, 2021, Texas Instruments announced that they would be purchasing this facility.

Adobe Systems based one of its U.S. buildings in Lehi, which is home to about 900 employees. According to the Adobe website, "The team in Utah is focused on engineering, product development, sales, marketing, and operations for the industry-leading Adobe Marketing Cloud."

IASIS Healthcare built Lehi's first hospital, which opened in June 2015. The company broke ground for the medical center in February 2014. The 23-acre campus houses a 40-bed, full-service facility with an emergency department, intensive care unit, medical imaging, cardiac lab, surgical suites, and labor and delivery.

Vivint operates a five-story office building in Lehi where the majority of its engineering work takes place.

Ancestry.com moved its headquarters from Provo to Lehi in May 2016. The headquarters building is located in The Corporate Center at Traverse Mountain. Its competitor MyHeritage also has an office in Lehi.

Microsoft has an engineering department specializing in the next version of its MDOP (Microsoft Desktop Optimization Pack), code-named "Park City." Initially employing 100, Microsoft has built a second building to house its staff.

Other Thanksgiving Park tenants are Oracle Corporation, Infusionsoft, Workfront, Vivint Solar, Agel Enterprises, DigiCert, Jolt and ProPay Inc.

Fixed wireless internet service provider (ISP) WeLink is based in Lehi.

Purple Innovation (PRPL) is headquartered in Lehi, Utah. https://www.marketbeat.com/stocks/NASDAQ/PRPL/

== Arts and culture ==
=== Attractions ===
==== Lehi Roller Mills ====
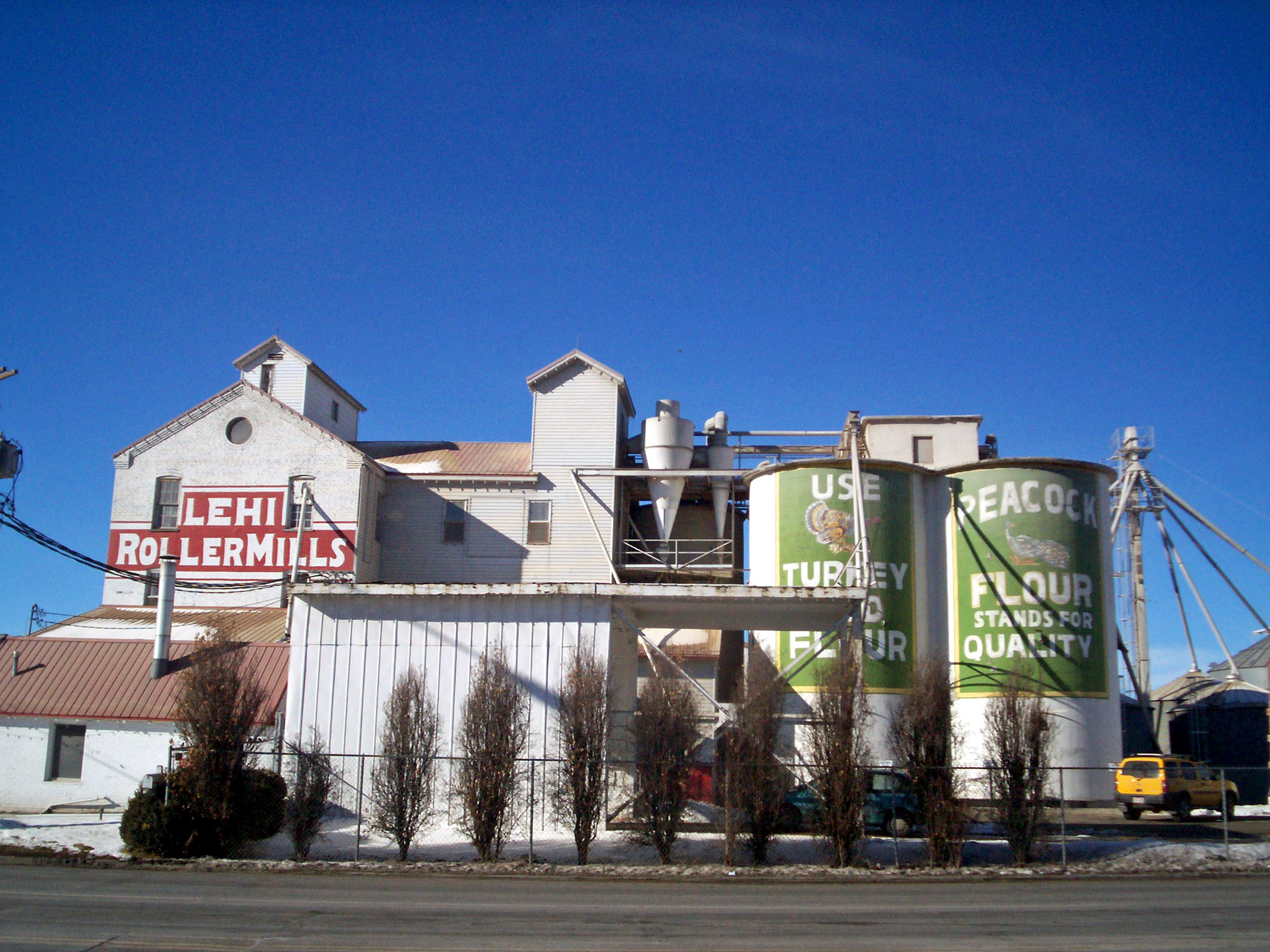
Lehi Roller Mills was featured in the movie Footloose (1984).

Lehi Roller Mills was founded in 1906 by a co-op of farmers. George G. Robinson purchased the mill in 1910, and it has since remained in the Robinson family, currently run by George's grandson, R. Sherman Robinson. The mill produces some 100,000 pounds of flour each day.

The turkey and peacock flour paintings of Lehi Roller Mills were painted on the silos about 1930 by Stan Russon of Lehi, Utah. He used a rope and pulley system to manually raise and lower himself to be able to paint.

Lehi Roller Mills was featured in the movie Footloose (1984) as Ren McCormack's workplace and as the site of the dance. At the time the film was made, Lehi Roller Mills was surrounded by nothing but vacant fields. In one scene, the Reverend Shaw Moore and his wife Vi Moore keep a wary eye on the proceedings while standing in a field some distance away. The area is now home to a variety of fast food restaurants and a shopping center.

The Lehi Roller Mills were listed on the U.S. National Register of Historic Places in 1994.

In 2012, the Mills filed for bankruptcy with the intention of continuing to operate during the proceedings.

==== Thanksgiving Point ====
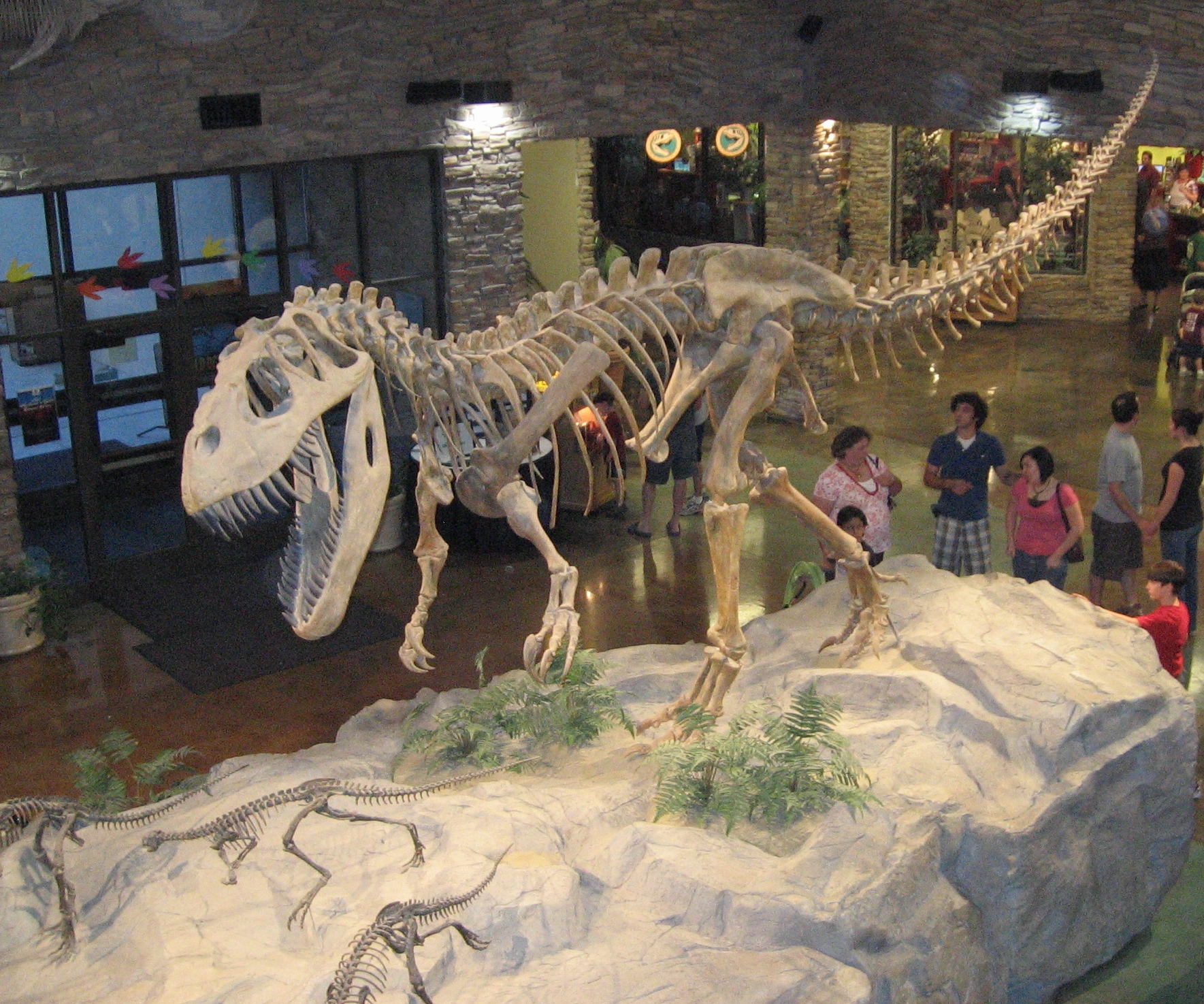
Lobby area in the Museum of Ancient Life (dinosaur skeletal mounts seen in the photograph: Othnielosaurus fleeing from Torvosaurus)

Thanksgiving Point is a nonprofit museum complex and estate garden founded in 1995. It consists of six main attractions: the Ashton Gardens, Thanksgiving Point Golf Course, the Museum of Ancient Life, the Museum of Natural Curiosity, Farm Country, and the Butterfly Biosphere. Approximately 1.45 million people visit Thanksgiving Point each year. It is also a location for Megaplex Theaters and has several restaurants and gift shops. It is the site for the region's only Tulip Festival, an annual Scottish Festival, annual Cornbelly's Halloween attraction, and Highland Games.

The complex is a 501(c)(3) organization with operations funded by private donations, venue and event admissions, and profits from shops and restaurants.

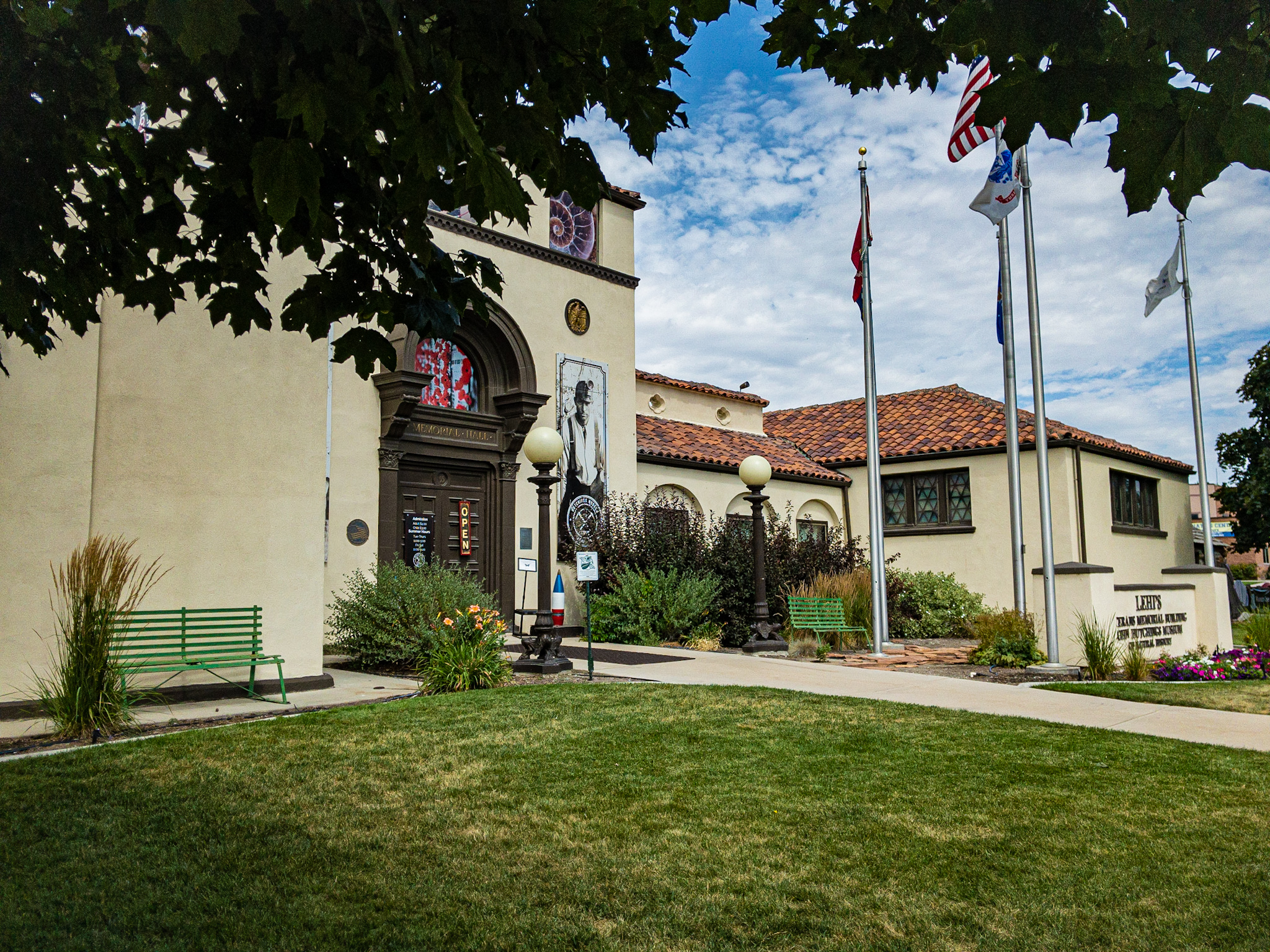
The Veterans Memorial Building currently houses Hutchings Museum.

==== Hutchings Museum ====
The Hutchings Museum is a museum located near the center of Lehi. It was first established in 1955 in what is now the Lehi Arts Building. The museum later moved its current location in the Veteran Memorial Building at 55 N Center St, Lehi, UT. The collection was donated to the city by John and Eunice Hutchings, who were amateur collectors and naturalists.

Originally designed to be a memorial for the veterans in World War I, the Veteran Memorial Building later expanded to host a library, courthouse, jail, police station, and fire station, among others.

The Hutchings Museum's exhibits include a large range of displays and artifacts featuring Native American culture, geology and paleontology, ornithology, live animals, and both local city and regional history.

Some of the Museum's most notable artifacts include a gun that reportedly belonged to Butch Cassidy, a large collection of rocks and minerals, and several pieces of Native American pottery. The museum has online articles, photos, videos, 3-D scans of artifacts, and a virtual tour.

== Education ==
Lehi's public schools are part of the Alpine School District. The district operates two high schools (Lehi High School and Skyridge High School), three junior high or middle schools, and ten elementary schools in the city.

Mountainland Technical College (MTECH) is a public technical training institution located in Lehi that serves high school seniors (through dual enrollment) and adult students. The Lehi campus offers training and education in automotive, culinary arts, healthcare, information technology, and a growing number of other industry-specific programs. It also partners with many area employers to provide customized training for their employees through the Custom Fit program.

Challenger School, a private school system with 27 campuses in the United States—six of them on the Wasatch Front—operates a school in the Traverse Mountain area of Lehi that serves preschool through eighth grade.

== Infrastructure ==
=== Transportation ===
I-15 runs through Lehi, with five exits (at American Fork Main St/SR-145, Lehi Main St/SR-73, 2100 North/SR-194, Triumph Blvd, and Timpanogos Highway/SR-92) located in the city. The Utah Transit Authority operates a bus system that reaches into the city. Work on the FrontRunner South commuter rail began in August 2008, and the Lehi station opened for service on December 12, 2012. The Lehi station is located near Thanksgiving Point.

== Notable people ==
- Brandon Armstrong, professional ballroom dancer; Dancing with the Stars contestant
- Bill Evans, modern dancer; choreographer, performer, teacher
- Garett Bolles, offensive tackle for the Denver Broncos of the NFL
- Connor Boyack, libertarian advocate; founder of The Libertas Institute
- Wilford Brimley, actor
- Paul Cummings, Olympic runner, half-marathon (former) world record holder
- Tony Finau, professional golfer playing on the PGA Tour
- Porter Rockwell, bodyguard to Joseph Smith and Brigham Young
- Eldred G. Smith, Patriarch to the Church for The Church of Jesus Christ of Latter-day Saints

== See also ==
- List of cities and towns in Utah
- Wines Park
