= Skyline High School (Idaho) =

Coordinates: 43.487°N 112.067°W

- 1767 Blue Sky Drive; Idaho Falls, Idaho; United States

Information
- Type: Public
- Established: 1968, 58 years ago
- School district: Idaho Falls School District#91
- Principal: Joshua Newell
- Teaching staff: 68.55 (FTE)
- Grades: 9–12
- Enrollment: 1,320 (2023–2024)
- Student to teacher ratio: 19.26
- Colors: Navy blue, white, & Columbia blue
- Athletics: IHSAA Class 5A
- Athletics conference: High Country (5A)
- Mascot: Grizzly
- Rival: Idaho Falls
- Yearbook: Behemoth
- Feeder schools: Eagle Rock Middle School
- Elevation: 4,700 ft (1,430 m) AMSL
- Website: shs.ifschools.org

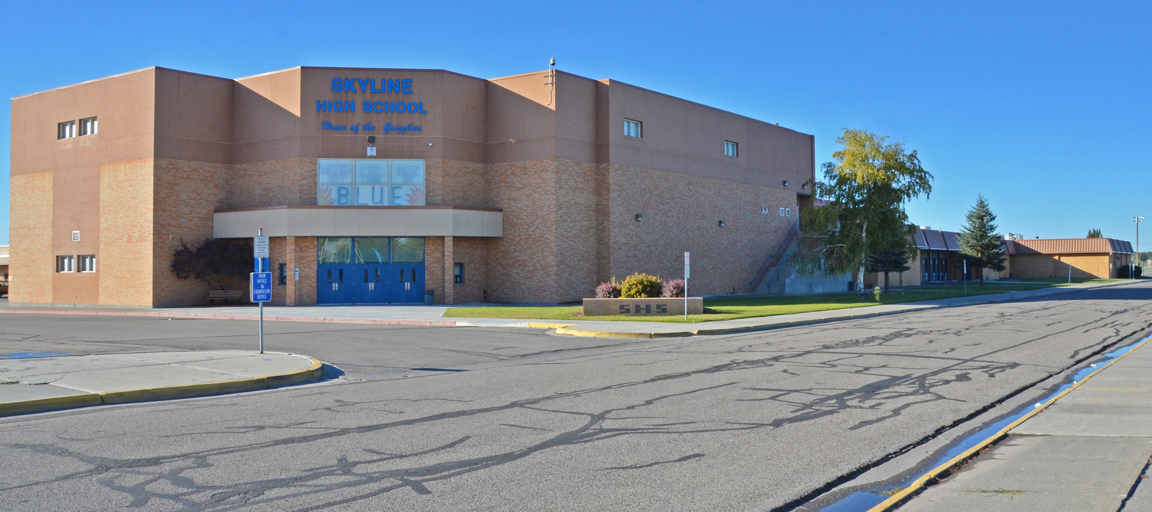
Skyline High School in 2013

Skyline High School is a four-year public secondary school in Idaho Falls, Idaho, one of two traditional high schools of the Idaho Falls School District #91. The school opened in 1968 on the west side of Idaho Falls, west of the Snake River. The school colors are navy blue, white, and Columbia blue, and the mascot is a grizzly.

== History ==
Skyline was the second high school established in Idaho Falls, following Idaho Falls High School (IFHS), and the third in the Idaho Falls area after Bonneville High School.

Skyline High School was created in the fall of 1966, but due to incomplete construction, neither of the first two graduating classes (1967 or 1968) actually attended classes at the high school. Those students attended split sessions at Idaho Falls High School during both the 1966–67 and 1967–68 school years. IFHS students attended school in the morning, and Skyline students attended in the afternoon. The class of 1969 was the first to attend and graduate from the new building. The first principal of Skyline was Richard C. Bigelow.

The school was originally planned to be built on the southeast side of Idaho Falls along Sunnyside Road, where the majority of the new students lived. However, due to immense protests by residents on the west side of town, the school was built on the west side, i.e., west of the Snake River. When Skyline was completed, it was thought of as the "country" school, because it was located away from the populated area. In the following decades the town grew to surround the high school. It was named after Skyline Drive, a major artery in Idaho Falls that ran from the Idaho Falls Airport to the edge of the high school. The street was named in the early 1950s by Margaret Cope Johns who with her husband Merritt Miller Johns developed the Johns Addition.

In 2012, Idaho Falls School District #91 made a change to the school system. Clair E. Gale Jr. High School did not have the students to stay open. The district made Clair E. Gale into a magnet high school, called Compass Academy. This caused the freshman to be moved into the high schools, with Skyline and Idaho IFHS serving grades 9 through 12, rather than grades 10 through 12 as they had previously done. The change caused Eagle Rock and Taylorview Jr. High to become middle schools. School service borders were also changed.

== Athletics ==
Skyline competes in athletics in IHSAA Class 4A. It is currently a member of the High Country Conference (5A), competing against Idaho Falls, Pocatello, Preston, Century, Hillcrest, Bonneville, and Blackfoot.

=== Football ===
Skyline's primary sports rival is the crosstown Idaho Falls High School (IFHS). The schools share an outdoor football and track stadium adjacent to IFHS named Ravsten Stadium, named for Vernon Ravsten, the first coach of Skyline but who had transferred from Idaho Falls. Each year the schools face off in a football game to decide the color of the goal posts at Ravsten Stadium (orange for Idaho Falls or blue for Skyline). The event has come to be known as the Emotion Bowl. The rivalry between the two schools became very intense, and even garnered national attention. Local officials saw the need to lessen the intensity, which was accomplished by rescheduling the game from the traditional end-of-season game on a Saturday afternoon to earlier in the season. This had the calming effect that the officials were looking for. In 2014 the game returned to the last Saturday of the high school football season, but that change was not permanent — e.g., in 2022 the game was played in late September.

=== State titles ===
Boys

- Football (9): fall (A-1 Div II, now 5A) 1985, 1986, 1989, 1992, (4A, now 5A) 2016, 2017, 2020, 2021, 2022 (official with introduction of playoffs, fall 1979)
  - (unofficial poll titles – 0) (poll introduced in 1963, through 1978)
- Cross Country (5): fall 1997, 2016, 2024, 2025, 2026
- Basketball (2): 1971, 1989
- Wrestling (6): 1977, 1978, 1981, 1982, 1984, 2002
- Track and Field (1): 2019

Girls

- Volleyball (2): fall 1979, 2000(introduced in 1976)
- Track (2): 1992, 1993 (introduced in 1971)
- Cross Country (1): 2017

== Gallery ==
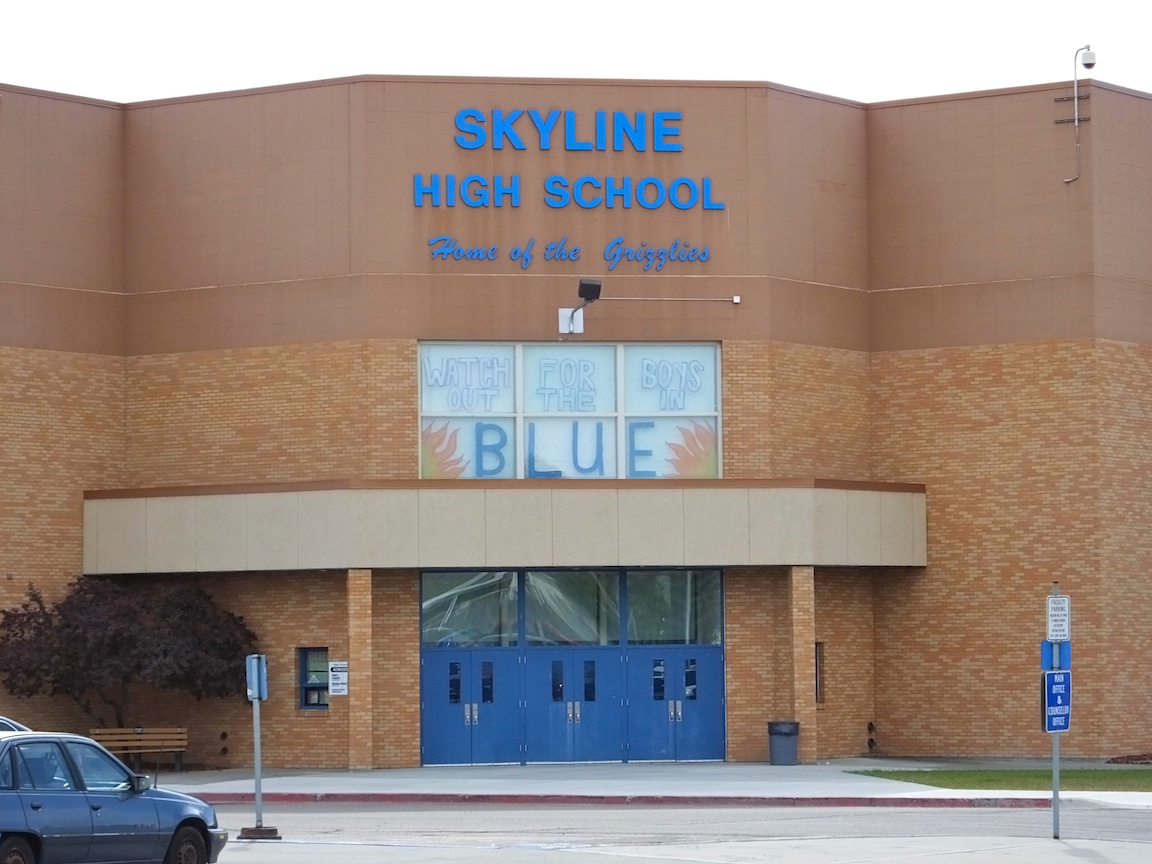
Skyline High School in Idaho Falls

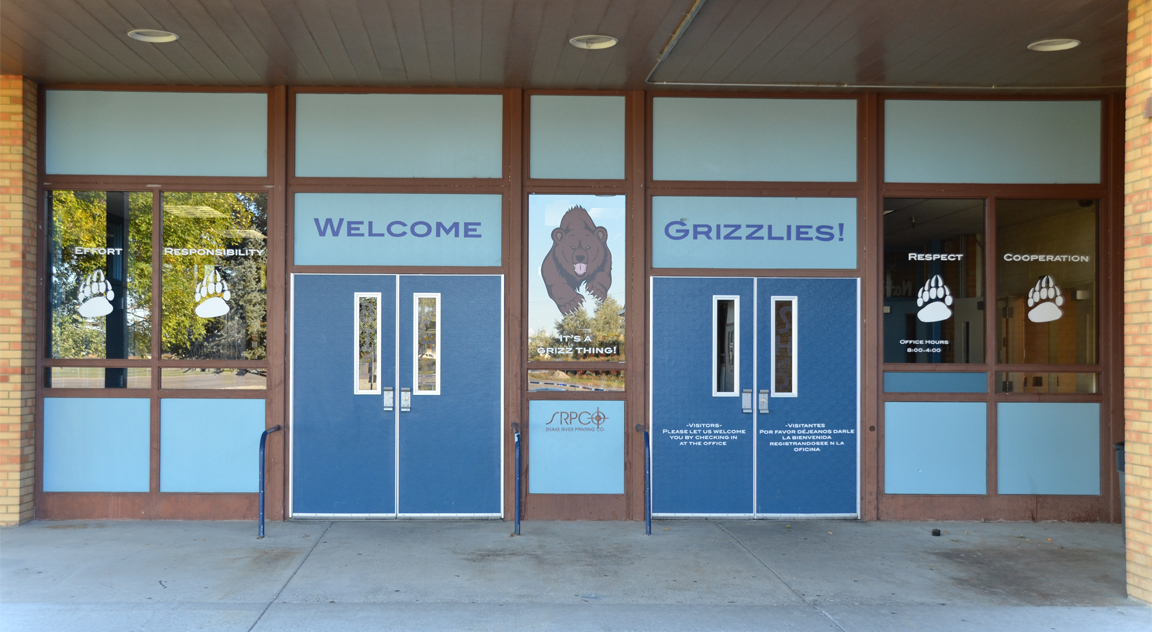
Skyline High School front entrance
