= Lynn Jurich =

American businesswoman and investor (born 1979)

- Born: 1979 (age 46–47); Tacoma, Washington, U.S.
- Education: Stanford University (BS, MBA)
- Occupations: Businesswoman, Investor, CEO
- Years active: 2002–present
- Employer: Sunrun
- Spouse: Brad Murray (m. 2007)
- Children: 2
- Awards: Fortune magazine 40 Under 40
- Website: Sunrun.com

Lynn Michelle Jurich (/ˈdʒʊərɪtʃ/; born c. 1979) is an American businesswoman and investor who is the co-founder and former CEO of Sunrun, a home solar power installation, financing, and leasing company headquartered in San Francisco, California. In addition to leading Sunrun, Jurich is also an angel investor.

== Career ==
After completing her undergraduate degree at Stanford University in 2002, Jurich had a brief stint as an associate at Summit Partners, a private equity firm.

Jurich co-founded Sunrun in 2007 with Stanford Graduate School of Business classmates Edward Fenster and Nat Kreamer.

Jurich was named one of the Ten Most Powerful Women Entrepreneurs by Fortune magazine in 2009, and received the 2010 Ernst & Young Entrepreneur of the Year award in the Northern California region and was a national finalist together with SunRun co-founder Ed Fenster. In 2013, Jurich was named one of Fast Company's Most Creative People in Business. Forbes magazine listed her as one of their Women to Watch in 2015.

Jurich served on the board of directors of the Sierra Club and holds an MBA and BS in science, technology, and society from Stanford University.

In July 2018, Jurich was listed on Fortune magazine's 40 Under 40 list as one of the most influential people in business under the age of 40. That same year, Inc. Magazine named Lynn as one of the top 100 Female Founders. The honor recognizes female visionaries who are creating jobs and changing the world.

== Personal life ==
Jurich married Brad Murray, who is president of the cosmetics company Tatcha, in 2007. She lives in San Francisco and has two children.

== See also ==
- List of chief executive officers
- List of female top executives
