= RE+ Trade Show =

Conference

RE+ Trade Show (formally Renewable Energy Plus) is a solar power conference created in 2004 for show-casing new technology when the Solar Electric Power Association (SEPA) and the Solar Energy Industries Association (SEIA) merged to organize an annual event bringing together companies and professionals from the solar industry. In 2008 it was touted as the largest solar power conference in North America. Previously called Solar Power Conference and Expo and later Solar Power International, it consists of two main elements: an exhibition hall where companies have booths to promote their products and services; and conference sessions where panels of solar industry experts share ideas and success stories. The 2018 event included hydrogen and fuel cell technologies. The conference was held virtually in 2020 due to the COVID-19 pandemic and in 2021 due to Hurricane Ida.

== Attendees ==
RE+ is attended by professionals in the solar industry including builders, project developers, installers, distributors, engineering firms, investors and financiers, service providers, law firms, equipment manufacturers, software companies, and manufacturers of tools for equipment manufacturing. Representatives from utilities also attend the conference as well as government representatives, policymakers, and the press.

Members of the Solar Energy Industries Association and the Solar Electric Power Association receive discounts on registration.

The majority of attendees of Solar Power International come from the United States, however there are a large number of attendees from major solar markets such as China, Japan, and Germany.

== Conference Sessions ==
The conference sessions at RE+ are traditionally separated by topic into different tracks. Typical tracks are technical, marketing & sales, market conditions, finance, and politics. There are generally over 70 sessions over the four-day conference. For the 2026 conference, planned topics include photovoltaics, energy storage systems, hydrogen technologies, microgrids, wind energy, electric vehicle infrastructure, and the digitalization and electrification of power grids. Start-Up Alley, located on the Expo floor, is a dedicated area specifically designed to promote up-and-coming ideas and companies in the solar industry. It was added to the conference features in 2013.

== Past Conferences ==
Year	Venue	Attendance
2004	San Francisco, CA, USA	
2005	Washington, DC, USA	
2006	San Jose, California, USA	
2007	Long Beach, California, USA	12,500
2008	San Diego, California, USA	23,200
2009	Anaheim, California, USA	24,000
2010	Los Angeles, California, USA	23,300
2011	Dallas, Texas, USA	25,000
2012	Orlando, Florida, USA	21,000
2013	Chicago, Illinois, USA	13,000
2014	Las Vegas, Nevada, USA	12,000
2015	Anaheim, California, USA	15,000
2016	Las Vegas, Nevada, USA	18,000
2017	Las Vegas, Nevada, USA	20,000
2018	Anaheim, CA, USA	19,000
2019	Salt Lake City, UT, USA	19,000
2022	Anaheim, California, USA	27,000
2023	Las Vegas, Nevada, USA	40,000
2024	Anaheim, California, USA	40,000
2025	Las Vegas, Nevada, USA	37,000
2026	Las Vegas, Nevada, USA	
