= Sunrun =

American renewable energy company

Sunrun Inc.
- Type: Public
- Traded as: Nasdaq: RUN; S&P 600 component
- Industry: Renewable energy
- Founded: 2007; 19 years ago
- Founders: Lynn Jurich; Ed Fenster; Nat Kreamer
- Headquarters: 600 California Street, Suite 1800, San Francisco, California, U.S.
- Key people: Mary Powell (CEO); Lynn Jurich (co-chair); Edward Fenster (co-chair)
- Production output: ▲8,404 megawatts solar (2025
- Revenue: ▲US$2.96 billion (2025)
- Operating income: ▲US$−126.1 million (2025)
- Net income: ▲US$449.9 million (2025)
- Total assets: ▲US$22.6 billion (2025)
- Total equity: ▲US$4.27 billion (2025)
- Number of employees: 9,059 (2025)
- Website: sunrun.com

Sunrun Inc. is an American provider of photovoltaic systems and battery energy storage products headquartered in San Francisco, California.

== History ==
=== Early history (2007–2014) ===
Sunrun was founded in January 2007 by Lynn Jurich, Ed Fenster, and Nat Kreamer, with Jurich and Fenster having met as classmates at Stanford Graduate School of Business. Sunrun introduced a "solar-as-a-service" model under which the company would own and maintain the rooftop equipment while customers paid for the electricity generated through long-term contracts, removing the upfront installation cost associated with residential solar power.

In June 2008, Sunrun raised $12 million in venture capital funding from a group of investors including Foundation Capital. In 2009, Sunrun closed a Series B round of funding for $18 million led by Accel Partners and joined by Foundation Capital. The company also received an additional commitment of $90 million in tax equity from U.S. Bancorp in 2009, following the $105 million in project financing from the bank in 2008. In June 2010, Sunrun struck a deal with PG&E for $100 million. Following the deal, the company announced $55 million in fresh capital from Sequoia Capital. In May 2014, the company raised $150 million.

In 2014, Sunrun acquired the residential division of REC Solar, wholesale distributor AEE Solar, and racking hardware manufacturer SnapNrack from Mainstream Energy Corporation.

=== Listing, federal investigations, and shareholder litigation (2015–2019) ===
In 2015, Sunrun went public on the Nasdaq stock exchange at $14 per share, with an initial market capitalization of $1.36 billion. Also, in 2015, launched its BrightBox battery energy storage product in Hawaii and expanded it to California the following year.

In May 2017, the Wall Street Journal reported that the Securities and Exchange Commission (SEC) had issued a subpoena to Sunrun and was investigating whether the company had adequately disclosed customer cancellations of residential solar contracts, a metric viewed as a gauge of company performance. On May 22, 2017, the Wall Street Journal published a follow-up article in which former Sunrun sales managers alleged that, in the period leading up to the August 2015 IPO, they had been instructed by superiors to delay processing of customer cancellations and that one manager had altered cancellation dates within Sunrun's sales system to make it appear cancellations had not yet occurred. By 2017, cancellations of contracts with Sunrun reached 40%.

In 2017, multiple securities class actions were filed against Sunrun and its officers in federal court in California and consolidated as In re Sunrun Inc. Securities Litigation. A related shareholder action filed in the Superior Court of California for the County of San Mateo under the case caption In re Sunrun Inc. Shareholder Litigation was subsequently settled.

In December 2018, documents released under the Freedom of Information Act indicated that on June 5, 2017, the Federal Bureau of Investigation had opened a separate corporate fraud investigation into Sunrun at the request of the United States Department of Justice, following a referral by the United States Attorney's Office for the Northern District of California.

=== Vivint Solar acquisition, impairment charge, and Muddy Waters Research (2020–2023) ===
In 2020, Sunrun acquired Vivint Solar for $3.2 billion. In 2023, the company recorded a non-cash goodwill impairment charge of US$1.2 billion related to its acquisition of Vivint Solar, writing down goodwill from US$4.3 billion to US$3.1 billion.

In October 2023, the short-seller Muddy Waters Research published a report alleging that Sunrun had "greatly exaggerated" its non-GAAP subscriber numbers for years and had claimed and sold tax credits based on inflated counts, with potential excess investment tax credits estimated at US$200 million for the 2022 tax year alone. Sunrun rejected the allegations, stating that the data the short-seller used from the U.S. Energy Information Administration was not comparable to its reported subscriber counts because EIA data excludes solar systems not yet operational or in active billing. Following publication, Glancy Prongay & Murray announced a securities investigation on behalf of Sunrun investors.

=== State attorney general investigations and lawsuits (2024–2026) ===
In July 2024, Connecticut Attorney General William Tong filed a consumer protection lawsuit in Hartford Superior Court against Sunrun Inc., Sunrun Installation Services, Bright Planet Solar, Elevate Solar Solutions and two named salespersons alleging deceptive, unfair and unlawful sales practices in violation of the Connecticut Unfair Trade Practices Act and Home Improvement Act, including forged customer signatures, voice impersonation of consumers on confirmation calls, unpermitted installations, non-functional systems and undisclosed price-escalation clauses in long-term solar contracts. The complaint sought restitution for affected consumers, disgorgement of profits, civil penalties, and injunctive relief. In March 2026, Tong announced that the suit against Sunrun remained pending alongside related actions against other solar industry companies.

From 2023 to 2025, Sunrun had been the focus of at least 170 consumer complaints filed with the Massachusetts Attorney General's Consumer Advocacy & Response Division, more than any other solar company in the state during that period.

In April 2026, Texas Attorney General Ken Paxton issued civil investigative demands to Sunrun and three other residential solar installers, Freedom Forever, Lone Star Solar Services and CAM Solar, as part of a broader initiative examining alleged violations of the Texas Deceptive Trade Practices–Consumer Protection Act, including misrepresentations of energy bill savings, system efficacy, equipment installation, and contract terms.
