= Vivint Solar =

Former American solar energy company

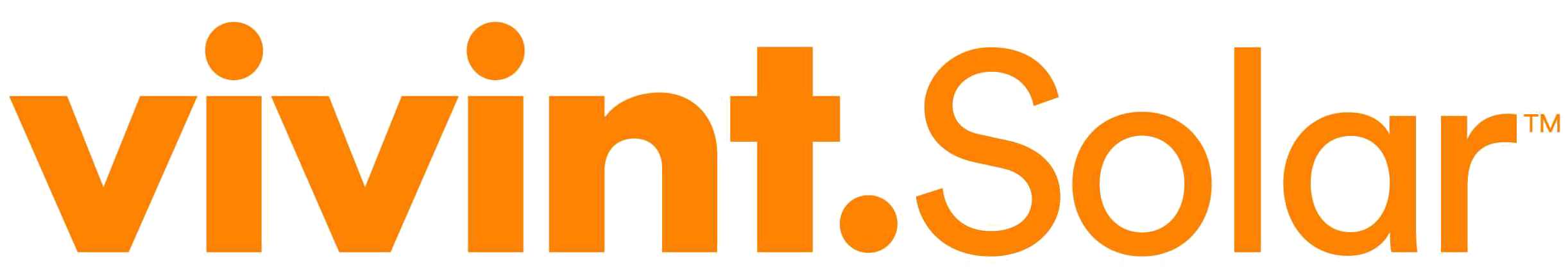
- Company type: Public
- Traded as: NYSE: VSLR; Russell 2000 Index component
- Industry: Renewable energy
- Founded: 2011
- Defunct: October 2020 (purchased by Sunrun)
- Headquarters: Lehi, Utah
- Areas served: 23 states
- Key people: David Apalone Bywater (CEO)
- Website: vivintsolar.com (defunct)

Vivint Solar was an American provider of photovoltaic solar energy generation systems, primarily for residential customers. The company was established in 2011 as an offshoot of home automation and security company Vivint and was headquartered in Lehi, Utah. The company primarily used a power purchase agreement (PPA) business model where Vivint Solar installed and maintained a solar system on a customer's home, then sold power to the customer at an agreed upon rate for a set term. In 2020, the company was purchased by Sunrun, another solar company primarily focused on the PPA business model for $3.2 billion.

At the time of the merger, Vivint Solar had installed a total of 1.29 gigawatts of power for over 188,000 customers in 23 U.S. states (Arizona, California, Colorado, Connecticut, Florida, Hawaii, Illinois, Maryland, Massachusetts, Nevada, New Hampshire, New Jersey, New Mexico, New York, Pennsylvania, Rhode Island, South Carolina, Texas, Utah, Vermont, and Virginia).

== History ==
Vivint Solar was founded in October 2011 as the solar division of the home automation and security company Vivint. The company marketed solar as part of its Smart Home product, with customers able to track energy consumption to save electricity.

In November 2012, the Blackstone Group acquired a controlling interest in Vivint, Vivint Solar, and 2GIG Technologies for in excess of $2 billion. After the Blackstone acquisition, the solar division became a stand alone company and grew to become the second largest residential solar installer in the United States in 2013, mostly through door-to-door sales. In October 2014, Vivint Solar went public on the New York Stock Exchange. A class-action lawsuit was filed against Vivint in December 2014, with allegations that the company misled investors in their initial public offering by omitting data that showed the company's PPA model was falling out of favor with consumers. Vivint contended that the lawsuit lacked legal merit.

In July 2015, SunEdison announced plans to buy Vivint Solar for US$2.2 billion, but the deal fell through by March 2016 with Vivint Solar suing for a "willful breach" of the planned merger. Shortly after, SunEdison entered bankruptcy.

Vivint Solar struggled after the failed merger attempt with investors noting that while the company had greater access to capital, installation of home solar panels fell substantially with a drop of 21% from late 2015 to late 2016. Also contributing to Vivint's financial troubles was that, starting in 2016, the PPA model was losing favor with consumers who increasingly preferred to buy solar power systems outright. Starting in late 2016, Vivint Solar started offering loans and cash sales, leading to 84% year-over-year growth in revenue. Also in 2016, Vivint Solar introduced a new CEO, David Bywater.

The company entered the home energy storage market in 2017, announcing a partnership with Mercedes-Benz Energy to offer home storage batteries. The partnership was announced less than a year later, with LG Chem becoming the company's battery provider.

In 2018, The Attorney General of New Mexico filed a lawsuit against Vivint Solar, Inc. saying it was engaging in unfair and unconscionable business practices including clouding titles to consumers’ homes, fraud and racketeering. Later in 2018, Vivint counter-sued the New Mexico Attorney General.

In July 2020, Sunrun announced that it would acquire Vivint Solar for $3.2 billion. By early October 2020, the acquisition was completed following the approval by regulators and stockholders of both companies, creating a valuation of approximately $22 billion.
