= Robert Jarvik =

American inventor (1946–2025)

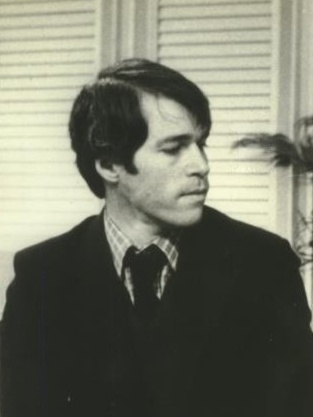
- Jarvik on Good Morning America in 1981
- Born: Robert Koffler Jarvik; May 11, 1946; Midland, Michigan, U.S.
- Died: May 26, 2025 (aged 79); New York City, U.S.
- Education: Syracuse University; New York University; University of Utah
- Occupations: Scientist; researcher
- Known for: Jarvik-7 artificial heart
- Spouses: Elaine Levin (m. 1968; div. 1985) Marilyn vos Savant (m. 1987)
- Children: 2
- Relatives: Murray Jarvik (paternal uncle)
- Website: www.jarvikheart.com

Robert Koffler Jarvik (May 11, 1946 – May 26, 2025) was an American scientist, researcher and businessman known for his role in developing the Jarvik-7 artificial heart.

== Early life ==
Robert Jarvik was born on May 11, 1946, in Midland, Michigan, to Norman Eugene Jarvik and Edythe Koffler Jarvik, and raised in Stamford, Connecticut. He was brother to Jonathan Jarvik, a biological-sciences professor at Carnegie Mellon University, as well as the nephew of Murray Jarvik, a pharmacologist who co-invented the nicotine patch. At an early age Jarvik showed interest in mechanics and medicine, which would later influence his work. By the age of 17 he had already obtained five patents for his inventions.

Jarvik was a graduate of Syracuse University. He earned a master's degree in medical engineering from New York University.

After being admitted to the University of Utah School of Medicine, Jarvik completed two years of study, and in 1971 was hired by Willem Johan Kolff, a Dutch-born physician-inventor at the University of Utah, who produced the first dialysis machine, and who was working on other artificial organs, including a heart. Jarvik received his M.D. in 1976 from the University of Utah. Jarvik was a medical scientist; he did not complete a clinical internship or residency and was never licensed to practice medicine.

== Career ==
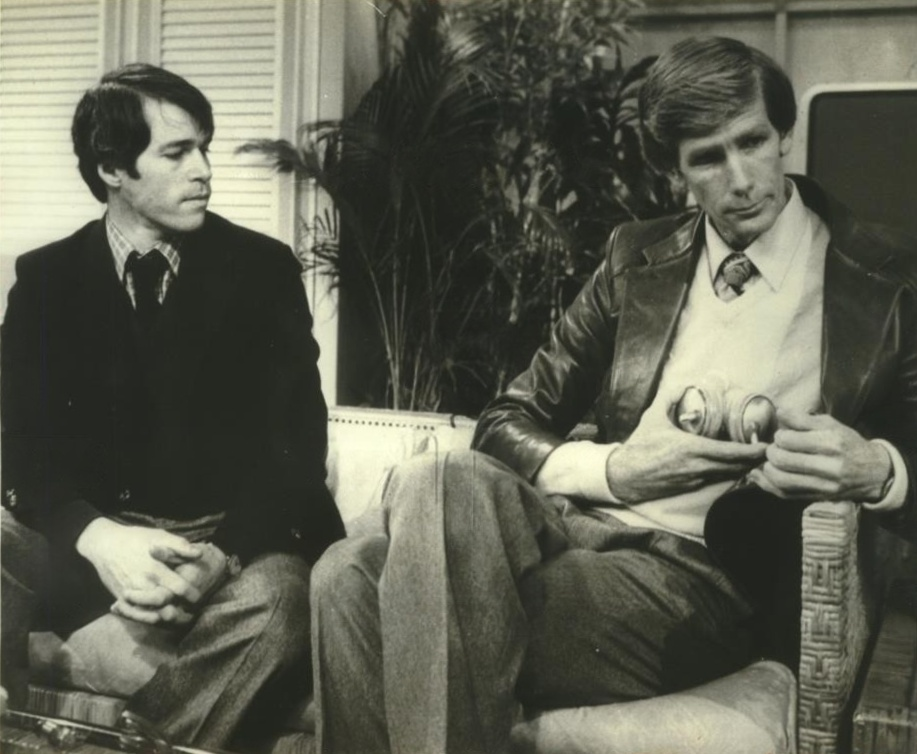
Jarvik (left) and William DeVries on Good Morning America in 1981. DeVries is holding an early model of an artificial heart.

Jarvik joined the University of Utah's artificial organs program in 1971, then headed by Willem Johan Kolff, his mentor. At the time, the program used a pneumatic artificial heart design by Clifford Kwan-Gett that had sustained an animal in the laboratory for ten days. Kolff assigned Jarvik to design a new heart that would overcome the problems of the Kwan-Gett heart, eventually culminating with the Jarvik-7 device.

In 1982, the team carried out an artificial heart implant — the second ever, 13 years after Domingo Liotta and Denton Cooley's first in 1969. William DeVries first implanted the Jarvik-7 into retired dentist Barney Clark at the University of Utah on December 1, 1982. Clark required frequent visits to the hospital for the next 112 days, after which he died. During frequent press conferences to update the patient's condition, Jarvik, along with DeVries, briefed the world's media on Clark's condition. The next several implantations of the Jarvik-7 heart were conducted by Humana, a large health care insurance company based in Louisville, Kentucky. The second patient, William J. Schroeder, survived 620 days. In 1983, Jarvik and DeVries received the Golden Plate Award of the American Academy of Achievement.

In 2006, Jarvik began appearing in television commercials for Pfizer's cholesterol medication Lipitor. Two members of Congress, as part of their campaign against celebrity endorsements, began an investigation as to whether his television advertisements constitute medical advice given without a license to practice medicine. One commercial depicted Jarvik rowing, wherein a body double was used. Later, Jarvik said that he had not taken Lipitor until becoming a spokesman for the company. On February 25, 2008, Pfizer announced that it would discontinue its advertisements with Jarvik.

== Personal life ==
Jarvik was married twice. He had a son and daughter with his first wife, Salt Lake City writer and journalist Elaine Jarvik. In 2011, she and her daughter wrote the play A Man Enters, inspired by Jarvik's absent-father relationship with his children since the couple's divorce.

Jarvik married Parade magazine columnist Marilyn vos Savant on August 23, 1987.

Contrary to some sources, Jarvik was not a member of the Church of Jesus Christ of Latter-day Saints.

Jarvik died from Parkinson's disease at his home in Manhattan, New York, on May 26, 2025, at the age of 79.
