= University of Utah School of Medicine =

Public medical school in Salt Lake City, Utah, US

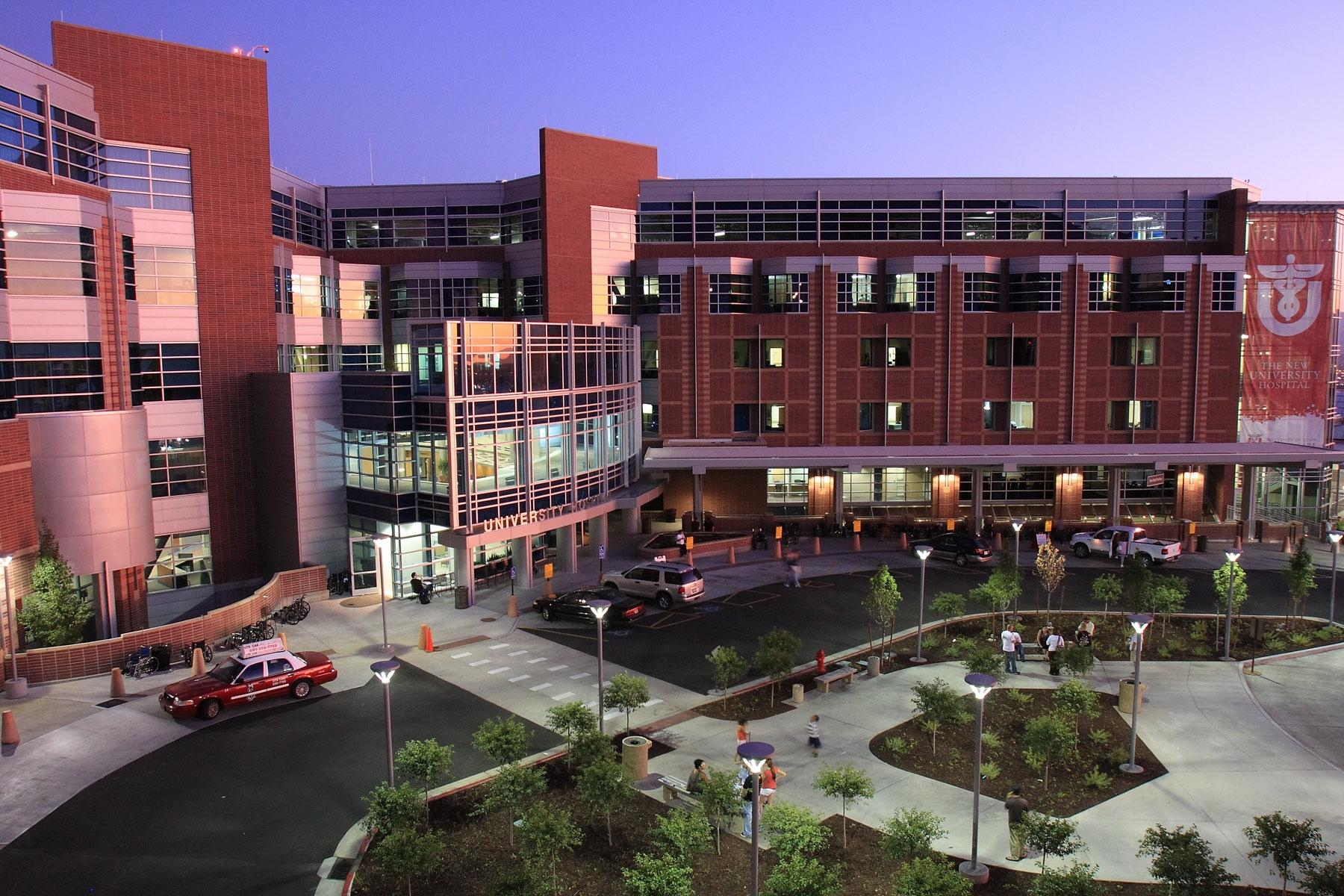
- Type: Public
- Established: 1905
- Dean: Michael L. Good, M.D.
- Students: 450
- Location: (United States) Salt Lake City, Utah, USA; 40°46′14″N 111°50′09″W
- Campus: Urban
- Website: medicine.utah.edu

The University of Utah School of Medicine is located on the upper campus of the University of Utah in Salt Lake City, Utah. It was founded in 1905 and is one of the only two MD-granting medical schools in the state of Utah.

== History ==
The school began in 1905 when the Biology department offered a two-year medical course. The founding dean was Dr. Ralph Vary Chamberlin. In 1912, the medical program was established as a separate two-year medical school and became a member of both the Association of American Medical Colleges and the American Medical Association. For the next 30 years, it continued as a two-year program; students were required to complete their final two years of training at other medical schools. The board of regents approved a four-year medical school in 1942.

In the 1950s and 1960s, the University of Utah School of Medicine emerged as a prominent center for bio-medical research, thanks to the work of pioneering physicians and scientists such as Maxwell Wintrobe, Louis Goodman, Homer R. Warner, and Willem Kolff. To this day, the school maintains a reputation for strong scientific investigation, especially in fields such as genetics and bio-medical informatics.

Medical education expanded significantly in 1977, when the University of Utah formed a partnership with Primary Children's Hospital, thus providing the medical school with a dedicated facility for teaching and research in pediatrics. The medical center has expanded even more in recent years, with the creation of the Huntsman Cancer Institute in 1995 and the expansion of the Moran Eye Center in 2006. Such developments have provided even greater learning opportunities for medical students, residents, and fellows at the school.

In 2007, Mario Capecchi, distinguished professor of human genetics and biology, was awarded the Nobel Prize in Physiology or Medicine for his method of introducing homologous recombination in mice by way of embryonic stem cells.

== Departments of the School of Medicine ==
The School of Medicine is divided into the following departments: Anesthesiology, Biochemistry, Biomedical Informatics, Dermatology, Family & Preventive Medicine, Human Genetics, Internal Medicine, Neurobiology and Anatomy, Neurology, Neurosurgery, Obstetrics & Gynecology, Oncological Sciences, Ophthalmology and Visual Sciences, Orthopaedics, Pathology, Pediatrics, Physical Medicine & Rehabilitation, Physiology, Psychiatry, Radiation Oncology, Radiology, and Surgery.

=== Centers and Institutes ===
- The Brain Institute
- Huntsman Cancer Institute
- Moran Eye Center
- Neuropsychiatric Institute
- Orthopaedic Center
- Primary Children's Hospital (affiliated)

== Notable alumni ==
- Monica Bertagnolli – surgical oncologist, professor at Harvard Medical School, director of the National Institutes of Health
- Ted M. Dawson – neurologist and neuroscientist; Director of the Institute for Cell Engineering at Johns Hopkins University
- William DeVries – renowned cardiothoracic surgeon, performed the first successful permanent artificial heart implant
- Brent C. James – internationally known expert in clinical quality improvement, featured on the cover of New York Times Magazine in November 2009
- Robert Jarvik – medical scientist, inventor of the artificial heart
- Robert Metcalf – educator and pioneer in arthroscopic surgery and sports medicine
- Russell M. Nelson – renowned cardiothoracic surgeon, served as president of the Church of Jesus Christ of Latter-day Saints (LDS Church) from 2018 to 2025
- Dale G. Renlund – cardiologist and member of the Quorum of the Twelve Apostles of the LDS Church
- J. Charles Rich Jr. – neurosurgeon, former president of the American Association of Neurological Surgeons
- Cecil O. Samuelson – physician and administrator, former president of Brigham Young University

== Notable faculty ==
- Balamurali Ambati – ophthalmology educator and researcher, became the world's youngest doctor at age 17
- Carrie L. Byington – pediatric infectious disease specialist and healthcare administrator
- Mario Capecchi – molecular geneticist, winner of 2007 Nobel Prize in Physiology or Medicine
- Dana Carroll – distinguished professor of biochemistry specializing in genome engineering
- Ralph Vary Chamberlin – biologist, historian, and pioneering ethnographer; served as first dean of the medical school from 1905 to 1907
- Louis S. Goodman – chemotherapy pioneer, co-author of Goodman & Gilman's The Pharmacological Basis of Therapeutics
- Edward I. Hashimoto – popular professor of human anatomy from 1935 to 1987; longest-tenured professor in the history of the University of Utah (52 years)
- Susan Horn – statistician and researcher in biomedical informatics
- Janet Iwasa – data visualization designer for molecular processes
- Willem Johan Kolff – physician and scientist, prominent researcher in hemodialysis and artificial organs
- Vivian Lee – radiologist and administrator; served as Senior Vice President for health sciences, CEO of University Healthcare, and dean of the medical school at Utah
- John M. Opitz – medical geneticist who has identified and described many different genetic syndromes
- Anne G. Osborn – author, educator, and physician; well-known nationally as a leader in the field of neuro-radiology
- Chase N. Peterson – administrator, educator, and expert in endocrinology and renal disease; president of the University of Utah from 1983 to 1991
- Mark Skolnick – founder of Myriad Genetics
- Geoffrey Tabin – professor of ophthalmology; also a noted adventurer and humanitarian; co-founder of the Himalayan Cataract Project
- Homer R. Warner – pioneer in the field of biomedical informatics
- Maxwell Wintrobe – physician and researcher, prominent expert in the field of hematology

== Notable achievements ==
- The field of biomedical informatics was developed at the University of Utah. The Department of Biomedical Informatics was created in 1964 – the first in the nation – and today remains one of the most renowned programs of its kind in the world.
- In 1970, the university's hospital established the first cerebrovascular disease unit in the U.S. west of the Mississippi River.
- On December 1, 1982, the first artificial heart implant was performed at the University of Utah (by Dr. DeVries, mentioned above). The patient, retired dentist Barney Clark, had suffered from congestive heart failure. He survived for 112 days after the procedure. The implanted device was designed by Robert Jarvik (also mentioned above), who was a medical student at the U of U at the time.
- Utah is known throughout the world as a leader in the study of human genetics. The school has been involved in some of the most valuable research in field, such as the sequencing of the tumor suppressor genes responsible for breast cancer in the 1990s.
- WebPath, the world's most popular pathology education website, was created in 1994 by Edward C. Klatt, a professor in the Department of Pathology at the time.
- Advanced Wilderness Life Support (AWLS) is a certification course created at the University of Utah in 1997. AWLS is the gold standard program – both nationally and internationally – for teaching management of medical emergencies in wilderness situations.
- The John A. Moran Eye Center annually ranks among national leaders in research grants from the National Institutes of Health.
- From 2000 to 2010, the residency training program in diagnostic radiology has been ranked #1 in the world by the American Board of Radiology.
