= Dale Lott =

American fire dispatcher (1944–1983)

- Born: March 24, 1944
- Died: December 28, 1983 (aged 39); Homestead Air Force Base, Florida, United States
- Known for: Campaigned to allow use of the first artificial heart

Dale Edward Lott (March 24, 1944 – December 28, 1983) was an American fire dispatcher and Navy non-commissioned officer who unsuccessfully applied to become the first patient to receive a permanent artificial heart. While Lott never received the implant, his subsequent media campaign succeeded in changing the rules for future applicants, allowing Barney Clark and other patients to receive theirs.

== Biography ==
Lott was raised in Columbus, Ohio, and lived for a time in nearby Pataskala. At the time that his congestive cardiac failure began in 1979, he was a chief petty officer in the U.S. Navy, serving on a destroyer in dry dock at Joint Base Charleston. He was discharged and moved to Homestead, Florida, where he began working as an emergency dispatcher for the Metro Dade Fire Rescue Department. In September 1981, Lott learned his condition was terminal, quitting his job the following month.

Because Lott had diabetes and a history of alcoholism, he was ineligible for a heart transplant. His physician wrote to the University of Utah asking for more information about its Jarvik-7 artificial heart, which had been successfully tested in animals and recently approved for human use. At that time, however, the rules for implantation of the Jarvik-7 were strict: it could only be installed in the event that a patient was already undergoing open-heart surgery, was placed on a cardiopulmonary bypass machine, and their natural heart could not resume its normal functioning. Lott's heart, despite its ongoing failure, could not be pre-emptively replaced with the Jarvik-7 unless it had already stopped altogether on an operating table.

With the help of the Dade County Association of Firefighters, the labor union Lott had been a member of, Lott began a media campaign in February 1982 advocating for his right to have an artificial heart implanted. He told the Miami Herald, "If I could find a doctor who would do it illegally, I would do it." The University of Utah refused Lott's request, considering it unethical to remove a beating heart from a patient's body. In March, Lott hired Miami attorney Ellis Rubin to sue the university to change its guidelines. Rubin threatened to dump Lott on the steps of the university building so officials "could watch him die."

Lott was the most prominent of 14 patients who had requested the Jarvik-7 be implanted in their bodies. The University of Utah ultimately agreed to review its policy. On May 24, 1982, the university announced that it would broaden the criteria for implantation, allowing patients suffering from cardiomyopathy like Lott to receive the artificial heart pre-emptively if their condition was inoperable and terminal. However, Lott's physician told him that his condition was too severe for him to benefit from the implant, and Lott removed his name from the waiting list on May 27, expecting to die imminently.

Beginning around June, however, Lott experienced an unexpected partial recovery, which his physician said could not be explained by current medicine. Lott attributed the recovery to his faith in God. By the time that a fellow cardiomyopathy sufferer, Barney Clark, became the first recipient of the Jarvik-7 on December 2, 1982, Lott had resumed normal life activities, albeit with continued difficulties. A year later, his condition began to deteriorate again. Lott died at 6:25 a.m. on December 28, 1983, at the Homestead Air Force Base hospital.
