= Jarvik-7 =

Artificial heart model

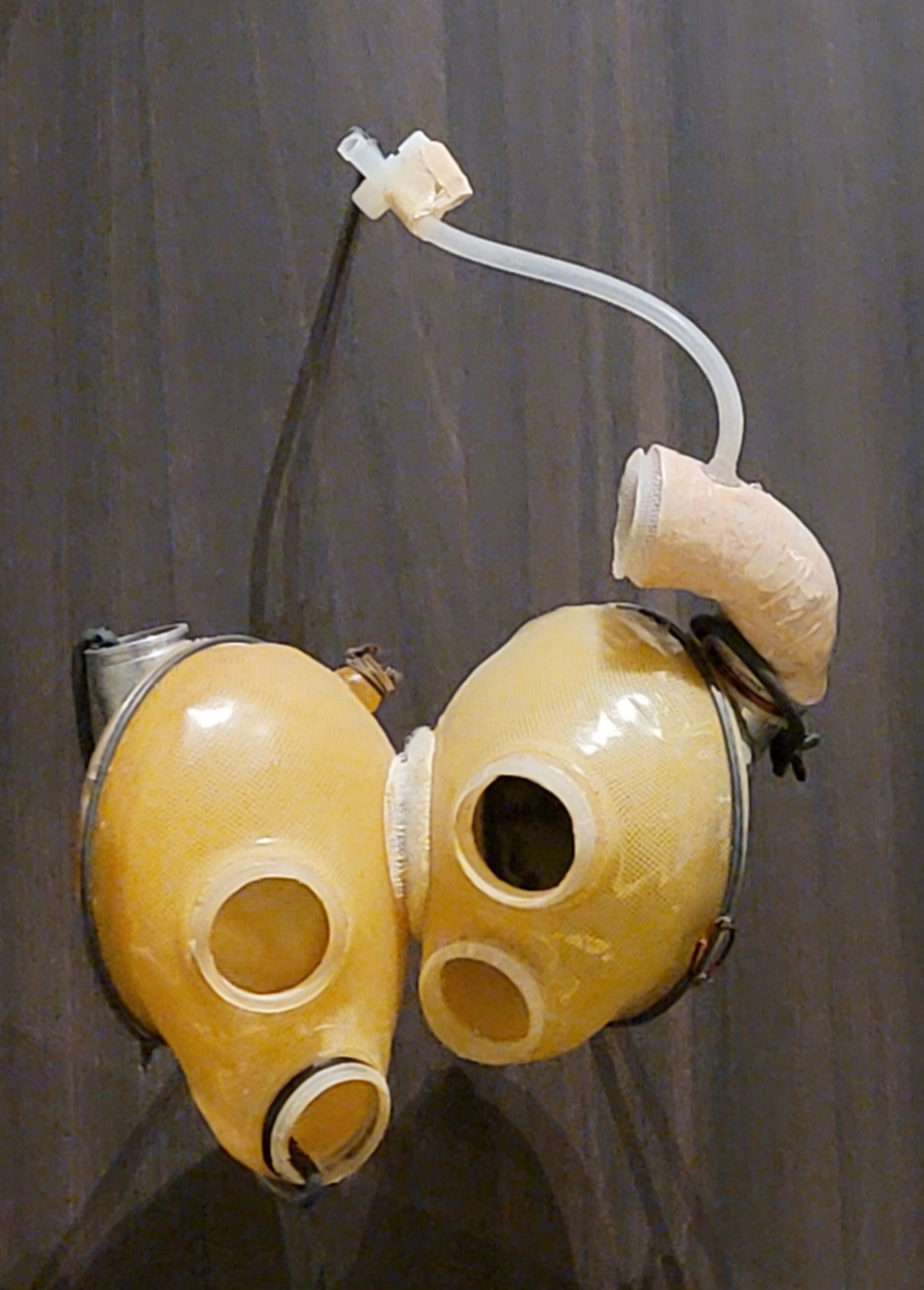
A Jarvik-7 prototype displayed at the National Museum of American History.

The Jarvik-7, also known as the Utah Heart and the Symbion J-7, was a model of artificial heart developed by the University of Utah and Kolff Medical, Inc. In 1982, the Jarvik-7 became the first artificial heart to be permanently implanted into a human patient, Barney Clark, who lived with it for 112 days. Four other patients received the Jarvik-7 as a permanent heart, all of them dying within less than two years after implantation, while other patients received it temporarily as a bridge to a heart transplant. The Jarvik-7 remained in use until 1990, when its approval for both permanent and temporary implantations was revoked by the U.S. Food and Drug Administration.

== Development ==
The first temporary artificial hearts were developed in the early 1950s at the advent of open heart surgery. These devices, such as the heart–lung machine, could take over the function of the heart for long enough to allow surgeons to operate on the organ or to perform a heart transplant, but a patient could not regain consciousness or perform normal activities with any of these artificial hearts.

In 1967, the University of Utah School of Medicine established its Division of Artificial Organs. Willem Johan Kolff, who had developed heart-lung machines as well as the first functioning artificial kidney, was hired as its director. A founding member of Kolff's research team was Clifford Kwan-Gett, who by 1971 had improved upon some of Kolff's past unsuccessful designs to produce an artificial heart which could keep laboratory animals alive for up to two weeks. However, the subjects were inevitably killed by blood clots which formed on the heart's rubber membrane. Kwan-Gett left the team in 1971 after disputes with Kolff about the program's direction.

Robert Jarvik was hired onto Kolff's team in 1971. Jarvik drew on the work of Kwan-Gett and Kolff, as well as that of Paul Winchell, in creating new designs for artificial hearts. He replaced the fibrilized silicone rubber of previous hearts with polyurethane, a smoother surface which created fewer clots. One of Jarvik's early models, the Jarvik-3, successfully kept a calf named Burke alive for three months in late 1974.

Donald Olsen, a consultant to the team and a doctor of veterinary medicine who had convinced them to use calves as their test subjects, proposed a change to Jarvik's design: keeping the natural heart valves of the subject in place and sewing them into the artificial heart, rather than removing them and replacing them with artificial valves. The first heart model using this innovation was the Jarvik-5, first tested on a calf in 1975; it lived for four months with the implant.

All of these precursor models had been designed for calves and were too large to fit in a human chest cavity. The Jarvik-7 was the first designed for humans, reducing the stroke volume of the heart from 160 mL (9.8 cu in) in the Jarvik-5 to 100 mL (6.1 cu in). Instead of polyurethane, the Jarvik-7 used polyethylene terephthalate, widely known as Dacron polyester.

== Use in humans ==
=== Cadaver trials ===
The first use of the Jarvik-7 in a human body took place at Temple University Hospital on May 3, 1981, when Kolff's team implanted it into the chest of a 54-year-old woman who had been brain dead for an hour due to an aneurysm. The woman had previously agreed to donate her body to science, but requested anonymity. The artificial heart pumped blood through the body for two hours before the experiment was stopped due to bleeding.

A longer experiment was performed at Temple on November 7, 1981, with the Jarvik-7 functioning in the body of a legally dead 28-year-old man for 10 hours. The implant allowed the man's corneas and a kidney to be removed for transplant. The subject's kidneys and liver functioned well, but a pulmonary edema forced an end to the experiment. A third test lasted for one and a half hours before being terminated due to bleeding.

A further test on a legally dead subject at Temple, designated "Case 4", was conducted in May 1982. The Jarvik-7, in addition to a respirator, successfully maintained blood flow without complications for 42 hours, from 5 p.m. May 8 to 11 a.m. May 10. The experiment was terminated so that the next-of-kin could make funeral arrangements.

The fifth and final of these tests at Temple occurred in December 1982, shortly after the first implant in a living patient. A 19-year-old brain-dead man received the implant on December 3, and it maintained function for 72 hours before being removed to allow next-of-kin to make funeral arrangements.

=== Permanent implantation ===
On June 11, 1980, Dr. William DeVries, chair of thoracic and cardiovascular surgery at the University of Utah Medical Center, asked the hospital's Review Committee for Research with Human Subjects to approve the use of the Jarvik-7 as a permanent replacement for the heart of a patient who would die without it. At the time, DeVries believed that a Jarvik-7 recipient was likely to recover from the operation and return to their home within 10 to 12 days after receiving the implant. After seven months of deliberation, the committee gave its approval, which DeVries publicly announced on January 27, 1981.

DeVries and Kolff then sought the approval of the U.S. Food and Drug Administration's Bureau of Medical Devices. Their first application was rejected by the FDA on March 25, 1981, stating that the application had "deficiencies" and that not enough information had been provided. One issue raised was that the team did not clearly indicate that the device would exclusively be used on patients with irreversible heart damage.

A revised application was approved by the FDA on September 10, with narrow restrictions on how the Jarvik-7 could be used. The agency would not permit an operation to be performed with the intent of implanting an artificial heart. The only scenario in which it could be implanted was if DeVries' team was performing open heart surgery on a patient, then determined that the patient would die unless their heart was replaced with the Jarvik-7.

Due to the stringent requirements, no Jarvik-7 implant surgeries were performed for over a year after FDA approval was received. Dale Lott, a firefighter from Miami with severe cardiomyopathy, was one of 14 patients who requested a Jarvik-7 implant and were turned down by DeVries' team. As his condition was medically considered inoperable, DeVries could not begin open heart surgery and thus could not implant the heart. In response, Lott began a media campaign advocating for the FDA's rules to be loosened. As a result of Lott's advocacy, the university agreed to reconsider its policy in May 1982. The following month, the FDA approved the change, allowing the Jarvik-7 to be implanted in cases of inoperable heart degeneration. Lott himself never received the implant he had campaigned for, as his condition unexpectedly improved; he died in December 1983.

==== Barney Clark ====
Barney Clark, a retired dentist from Seattle who had severe congestive heart failure, became the first living patient to receive the Jarvik-7 implant on December 2, 1982. Clark's case was highly publicized and received much media attention, garnering attention from television networks, newspapers and periodicals. Clark lived for 112 days with his Jarvik-7 tethered to a pneumatic drive console, a device weighing some 400 pounds (180 kg). During that time, Clark required several re-operations, suffered seizures, experienced prolonged periods of confusion and a number of instances of bleeding, and asked several times to be allowed to die. Clark, however, still believed his being part of the initial experiment was an important contribution to medicine, and maintained an overall positive outlook on his condition. Clark died on March 23, 1983, of multiorgan system failure. Despite the complications, DeVries considered Clark's case a success.

==== William Schroeder ====
After Clark's implant failed to meet the high expectations that had been placed on it, DeVries' team had difficulty raising money for further implant operations at the University of Utah. DeVries was approached by representatives of Humana Inc., then the world's largest for-profit hospital operating company, who offered to cover all the expenses associated with the next 100 Jarvik-7 implants, at an estimated cost of $25 to $30 million (equivalent to $80 to $90 million in 2025). Humana CEO David Jones said that he did not expect the artificial heart to turn a profit for the company, but that the publicity associated with the Jarvik-7 would give Humana an "enhanced reputation" that would be worth the money. DeVries accepted the offer, joining the faculty of Humana Hospital Audubon in Louisville, Kentucky, in 1984.

William J. "Bill" Schroeder was the second patient to receive a Jarvik-7 as a permanent implant, and the first to receive it in Louisville. DeVries replaced Schroeder's failing heart with a Jarvik-7 on November 25, 1984. Like Clark, Schroeder suffered from bleeding that required re-operation to resolve. In the first weeks, the outlook was good and Schroeder was allowed to have a can of Coors beer. He received a phone call from President Ronald Reagan, in which he famously asked the president for an update on a late Social Security check. However, 19 days after the operation, Schroeder suffered the first of four strokes. Despite this, his recovery continued, and he was allowed to live in a specially outfitted apartment near the hospital for a period of time, as well as use a newly developed battery-powered portable drive unit for the heart which allowed him to venture out of the hospital for short periods. Schroeder's health continued to decline as three more strokes plagued his time with the artificial heart. He died on August 6, 1986, from complications from a stroke, respiratory failure and sepsis, after 620 days with the artificial heart.

==== Subsequent patients ====
Murray Haydon, DeVries' third patient, received a Jarvik-7 on February 17, 1985. Haydon suffered pulmonary issues and was required to be on a mechanical ventilator for the duration of his time with the artificial heart. Haydon died of infection and kidney failure on June 19, 1986, after 488 days with his artificial heart.

On April 7, 1985, Dr. Bjarne Semb of Karolinska University Hospital in Stockholm implanted a Jarvik-7 in Swedish businessman Leif Stenberg. Stenberg lived 229 largely uneventful days with the heart, but suffered from a stroke and subsequently died on November 21, 1985.

Jack Burcham was DeVries' fourth and final patient to receive a Jarvik-7 as a destination therapy. Burcham received his heart on April 14, 1985, but due to complications from the size of the device, bleeding and kidney failure, Burcham died just 10 days later on April 25.

In the wake of these deaths, medical ethicist George Annas argued in 1987 that "there is simply not enough known about anticoagulation therapy (to prevent either bleeding or strokes) for this device to be used in humans at this time. More animal and laboratory research is required before human experimentation can ethically recommence." No further permanent implants of the Jarvik-7 were attempted after 1985.

=== Transplant bridge ===
The University of Arizona Medical Center in Tucson, Arizona, was the first hospital to receive FDA approval to use the Jarvik-7 as a temporary "bridge" implant, keeping a patient alive until a human heart could be made available to them for transplant. The first patient to temporarily receive a Jarvik-7 was Michael Drummond on August 29, 1985. He lived with the implant for nine days before a second operation was performed to replace it with a transplanted human heart. Drummond lived with the new heart for nearly five years, then died of multiple organ failure in July 1990.

Presbyterian–University Hospital in Pittsburgh, Pennsylvania, performed the second bridge implant of the Jarvik-7 in October 1985. Abbott Northwestern Hospital in Minneapolis, Minnesota, performed the third, which was also the first use of a "mini" model of the Jarvik-7 and the first to be implanted into a woman. Mary Lund received the mini-Jarvik-7 on December 18, 1985, living with it for 45 days before getting a transplant in February 1986. While Lund was living with the heart, the FDA rejected approval for the mini version of the Jarvik-7, stating that further tests were needed. Lund died in October 1986.

By November 21, 1986, a worldwide total of 33 patients had received the Jarvik-7 as a temporary heart while awaiting a transplant. A Presbyterian–University Hospital study found that nine of those patients died before receiving a transplanted human heart, and five died shortly after the transplant surgery, leaving 19 who were alive at the time of the study.

During the late 1980s, medical technology advanced to the point that the use of a Jarvik-7 was often no longer necessary to sustain patients waiting for a heart transplant. Smaller implants such as the ventricular assist device were developed, which could support the functioning of a failing natural heart rather than replacing it altogether. New medications were created which could slow a heart's deterioration without surgery. With these alternatives available and offering fewer complications, use of the Jarvik-7 declined.

== Ownership, names, and loss of FDA approval ==
The Jarvik-7 was developed by a public-private partnership between the University of Utah and a private company founded by Kolff in 1976, originally named Kolff Associates. Kolff created the company so that artificial organ research could continue on a for-profit basis in the event that the team lost its funding from the National Institutes of Health. In 1981, Kolff named Jarvik as president and chief executive officer of the company, later renamed Kolff Medical, Inc. Jarvik subsequently ousted Kolff from his role managing the company, leaving him only in the honorary position of chairman of the board.

During the widespread publicity surrounding Barney Clark's case, in February 1983, Clifford Kwan-Gett publicly came forward and claimed that the Jarvik-7 was substantially the same as his 1969 prototype design. Not wanting to take a position in the priority dispute, the University of Utah officially stopped referring to the artificial heart as the Jarvik-7, reverting to a name that had been applied to past prototype models: the "Utah Heart". Kolff Medical continued to refer to it as the Jarvik-7.

Jarvik changed the name of Kolff Medical to Symbion Inc. in 1984, shortly after the company's initial public offering placed it on the stock market. In 1987, Symbion was acquired in a hostile takeover by a private equity firm, E. M. Warburg Pincus & Company. The new ownership ousted Jarvik from the company's leadership and changed the device's name to the Symbion J-7. Under Warburg Pincus's ownership, Symbion's manufacturing facilities fell below FDA standards. Two inspections in 1989 found serious deficiencies in the quality of manufacturing, the reporting of adverse events, monitoring of research sites, servicing equipment, and training of personnel. As a result, the FDA revoked its approval of the Symbion J-7 for both temporary and permanent implants on January 10, 1990.

== Later artificial hearts and legacy ==
After leaving Symbion, Robert Jarvik turned his attention to developing an egg-sized ventricular assist device called the Jarvik 2000. Instead of replacing the heart, the Jarvik 2000 was designed as a "heart within a heart" that could take over a natural heart's functionality from the inside. Jarvik worked with The Texas Heart Institute, which had once been in fierce competition with Jarvik's team at the University of Utah, to develop the new device.

Symbion's intellectual property relating to the J-7 was transferred in 1991 to CardioWest Technologies, which resumed testing of the heart. An improved device based on the Jarvik-7, the CardioWest Total Artificial Heart, began to be used as a transplant bridge in January 1993. By September 2002, a total of 95 patients had received the CardioWest TAH as a temporary implant, 24 of whom died before receiving a heart transplant. One patient died as a result of the implant malfunctioning.

SynCardia Systems took over manufacturing and study of the device in 2001. Since then, further improvements to the total artificial heart have been made, reducing the occurrence of stroke and bleeding. SynCardia's model, still based on the Jarvik design, is the only total artificial heart approved by the FDA and by Health Canada. In 2025, it was reported that a patient in Serbia had lived for over seven years with the SynCardia Total Artificial Heart.
