= Marilyn vos Savant =

American columnist, author and lecturer (born 1946)

- Born: Marilyn Mach; August 11, 1946 (age 80); St. Louis, Missouri, U.S.
- Occupations: Author; columnist
- Spouse: Robert Jarvik (m. 1987; died 2025)
- Children: 2

Marilyn vos Savant (/ˌvɒs səˈvɑːnt/ VOSS sə-VAHNT; born Marilyn Mach; August 11, 1946) is an American magazine columnist who has the highest recorded intelligence quotient (IQ) in the Guinness Book of Records, a competitive category the publication has since retired. Since 1986, she has written "Ask Marilyn", a Parade magazine Sunday column wherein she solves puzzles and answers questions on various subjects, and which popularized the Monty Hall problem in 1990.

== Biography ==
Marilyn vos Savant was born Marilyn Mach on August 11, 1946, in St. Louis, Missouri, to parents Joseph Mach and Marina Ros Savant. Savant says one should keep premarital surnames, with sons taking their father's and daughters their mother's. The word savant, meaning someone of learning, appears twice in her family: her maternal grandmother's maiden name was Maria Savant while her maternal grandfather was Joseph Ros Savant (born Giuseppe Savant Ros), both hailing from Lanzo, Italy. Her father was born in Gladbeck, Prussia to Czech parents born in Bítovany and Borovany. She is of Italian and Czech ancestry. It had been assumed she was descended from the physicist and philosopher Ernst Mach, but this is disproven by her grandfather's baptism record.

She went to Meramec Community College and studied philosophy at Washington University in St. Louis but quit two years later to help with a family investment business. Savant moved to New York City in the 1980s to pursue a career in writing. Before starting "Ask Marilyn", she wrote the Omni I.Q. Quiz Contest for Omni, which included intelligence quotient (IQ) quizzes and expositions on intelligence and its testing.

Savant married Robert Jarvik (1946–2025), one of the co-developers of the Jarvik-7 artificial heart, on August 23, 1987, and was made Chief Financial Officer of Jarvik Heart, Inc. She has served on the board of directors of the National Council on Economic Education, on the advisory boards of the National Association for Gifted Children and the National Women's History Museum, and as a fellow of the Committee for Skeptical Inquiry. Toastmasters International named her one of "Five Outstanding Speakers of 1999", and in 2003 she was awarded an honorary Doctor of Letters degree from The College of New Jersey.

== Rise to fame and IQ score ==
Savant was listed in the Guinness Book of World Records under "Highest IQ" from 1985 to 1989 and entered the Guinness Book of World Records Hall of Fame in 1988. Guinness retired the "Highest IQ" category in 1990 after concluding IQ tests were too unreliable to designate a single record holder. The listing drew nationwide attention.

Guinness cited vos Savant's performance on two intelligence tests, the Stanford–Binet and the Mega Test. She took the 1937 Stanford–Binet, Second Revision test at age 10: she says her first test was in September 1956 and measured her mental age at 22 years and 10 months, yielding a 228 score. This figure was listed in the Guinness Book of World Records; it is also listed in her books' biographical sections and was given by her in interviews.

The second test reported by Guinness was the Mega Test, taken in the mid-1980s. The Mega Test yields IQ standard scores obtained by multiplying the subject's normalized z-score, or the rarity of the raw test score, by a constant standard deviation and adding the product to 100, with Savant's raw score reported by Hoeflin to be 46 out of a possible 48, with a 5.4 z-score, and a standard deviation of 16, arriving at a 186 IQ. The Mega Test has been criticized by professional psychologists as improperly designed and scored, "nothing short of number pulverization".

Savant sees IQ tests as measurements of a variety of mental abilities and thinks intelligence entails so many factors that "attempts to measure it are useless". She has held memberships with the high-IQ societies Mensa International and the Mega Society.

== "Ask Marilyn" ==
Following her listing in the 1986 Guinness Book of World Records, Parade ran a profile of her along with a selection of questions from Parade readers and her answers. Parade continued to get questions, so "Ask Marilyn" was made.

She used her column to answer questions on many chiefly academic subjects; solve logical, mathematical, or vocabulary puzzles posed by readers; answer requests for advice with logic; and give self-devised quizzes and puzzles. Aside from the weekly printed column, "Ask Marilyn" was a daily online column that added to the printed version by resolving controversial answers, correcting mistakes, expanding answers, reposting previous answers, and solving additional questions. No new columns have been published online since October 30, 2022.

Three of her books (Ask Marilyn, More Marilyn, and Of Course, I'm for Monogamy) are compilations of questions and answers from "Ask Marilyn". The Power of Logical Thinking includes many questions and answers from the column.

== Famous columns ==
=== Monty Hall problem ===
Savant was asked the following question in her September 9, 1990, column:

Suppose you're on a game show, and you're given the choice of three doors. Behind one door is a car, behind the others, goats. You pick a door, say #1, and the host, who knows what's behind the doors, opens another door, say #3, which has a goat. He says to you, "Do you want to pick door #2?" Is it to your advantage to switch your choice of doors?

This question is called the Monty Hall problem due to its resembling scenarios on the game show Let's Make a Deal, hosted by Monty Hall. It was a known logic problem before it was used in "Ask Marilyn". She said the selection should be switched to door #2 because it has a 2/3 probability of success, while door #1 has just 1/3. To summarize, 2/3 of the time the opened door #3 will indicate the location of the door with the car (the door you had not picked and the one not opened by the host). Only 1/3 of the time will the opened door #3 mislead you into changing from the winning door to a losing door. These probabilities assume you change your choice each time door #3 is opened, and that the host always opens a door with a goat. This response provoked letters from thousands of readers, nearly all arguing doors #1 and #2 each have an equal chance of success. A follow-up column reaffirming her position served only to intensify the debate and soon became a feature article on the front page of The New York Times. Parade received around 10,000 letters from readers who thought that her workings were incorrect.

Under the "standard" version of the problem, the host always opens a losing door and offers a switch. In the standard version, Savant's answer is correct. However, the statement of the problem as posed in her column is ambiguous. The answer depends on what strategy the host is following. If the host operates under a strategy of offering a switch only if the initial guess is correct, it would clearly be disadvantageous to accept the offer. If the host merely selects a door at random, the question is likewise very different from the standard version. Savant addressed these issues by writing the following in Parade magazine, "the original answer defines certain conditions, the most significant of which is that the host always opens a losing door on purpose. Anything else is a different question."

She expounded on her reasoning in a second follow-up and called on schoolteachers to show the problem to classes. In her final column on the problem, she gave the results of more than 1,000 school experiments. Most respondents now agree with her original solution, with half of the published letters declaring their authors had changed their minds.

=== "Two boys" problem ===
Like the Monty Hall problem, the "two boys" or "second-sibling" problem pre-dates Ask Marilyn, but generated controversy in the column, first appearing there in 1991–1992 in the context of baby beagles:

A shopkeeper says she has two new baby beagles to show you, but she doesn't know whether they're male, female, or a pair. You tell her that you want only a male, and she telephones the fellow who's giving them a bath. "Is at least one a male?" she asks him. "Yes!" she informs you with a smile. What is the probability that the other one is a male?

When Savant replied "one out of three", readers wrote the odds were 50–50. In a follow-up, she defended her answer, saying, "If we could shake a pair of puppies out of a cup the way we do dice, there are four ways they could land", in three of which at least one is male, but in only one of which none are male.

The confusion arises here because the bather is not asked if the puppy he is holding is a male, but rather if either is a male. If the puppies are labeled (A and B), each has a 50% chance of being male independently. This independence is restricted when at least A or B is male. Now, if A is not male, B must be male, and if B is not male, A must be male. This restriction is introduced by the way the question is structured and is easily overlooked – misleading people to the erroneous answer of 50%. See Boy or Girl paradox for solution details.

The problem re-emerged in 1996–97 with two cases juxtaposed:

Say that a woman and a man (who are unrelated) each have two children. We know that at least one of the woman's children is a boy and that the man's oldest child is a boy. Can you explain why the chances that the woman has two boys do not equal the chances that the man has two boys? My algebra teacher insists that the probability is greater that the man has two boys, but I think the chances may be the same. What do you think?

Savant agreed with the teacher, saying the chances were only 1 out of 3 that the woman had two boys, but 1 out of 2 the man had two boys. Readers argued for 1 out of 2 in both cases, prompting follow-ups. Finally, she began a survey, asking female readers with exactly two children, at least one of them male, to give the sex of both children. Of the 17,946 women who responded, 35.9%, about 1 in 3, had two boys.

	Woman has			
	young boy, older girl	young girl, older boy	2 boys	2 girls
Probability:	1/3	1/3	1/3	0

	Man has			
	young boy, older girl	young girl, older boy	2 boys	2 girls
Probability:	0	1/2	1/2	0

== Fermat's Last Theorem ==
A few months after Andrew Wiles said he had proved Fermat's Last Theorem, Savant published the book The World's Most Famous Math Problem (October 1993), which surveys the history of Fermat's Last Theorem as well as other mathematical problems. Reviewers questioned her criticism of Wiles' proof, asking whether it was based on a correct understanding of mathematical induction, proof by contradiction, and imaginary numbers.

Especially contested was Savant's statement that Wiles' proof should be rejected for its use of non-Euclidean geometry. Savant stated that because "the chain of proof is based in hyperbolic (Lobachevskian) geometry", and because squaring the circle is seen as a "famous impossibility" despite being possible in hyperbolic geometry, then "if we reject a hyperbolic method of squaring the circle, we should also reject a hyperbolic proof of Fermat's last theorem."

Specialists flagged discrepancies between the two cases, distinguishing the use of hyperbolic geometry as a tool for proving Fermat's Last Theorem from its use as a setting for squaring the circle: squaring the circle in hyperbolic geometry is a different problem from that of squaring it in Euclidean geometry, whereas Fermat's Last Theorem is not inherently geometry specific. Savant was criticized for rejecting hyperbolic geometry as a satisfactory basis for Wiles' proof, with critics pointing out that axiomatic set theory (rather than Euclidean geometry) is now the accepted foundation of mathematical proofs and that set theory is sufficiently robust to encompass both Euclidean and non-Euclidean geometry as well as adding numbers.

Savant retracted the argument in a July 1995 addendum, saying she saw the theorem as "an intellectual challenge – 'to find another proof using only tools available to Fermat in the 17th century.'" However, Wiles' original proof, presented in 1993, was found to contain an error during the peer review process, necessitating a subsequent correction by Wiles and Richard Taylor, which ultimately led to the acceptance of the proof in 1994.

The book came with a glowing introduction by Martin Gardner, which had been based on an earlier draft of the book that did not contain any of the contentious views.

== Publications ==
- 1985 – Omni I.Q. Quiz Contest (McGraw-Hill) ISBN 9780070393776
- 1990 – Brain Building: Exercising Yourself Smarter (co-written with Leonore Fleischer) ISBN 9780553353488
- 1992 – Ask Marilyn: Answers to America's Most Frequently Asked Questions (St. Martin's Press) ISBN 9780312081362
- 1993 – The World's Most Famous Math Problem: The Proof of Fermat's Last Theorem and Other Mathematical Mysteries (St. Martin's Press) ISBN 9780312106577
- 1994 – More Marilyn: Some Like It Bright! The Best of the "Ask Marilyn" Letters Published in Parade Magazine from 1992-1994 (St. Martin's Press) ISBN 9780312113841
- 1994 – "I've Forgotten Everything I Learned in School!": A Refresher Course to Help You Reclaim Your Education
- 1996 – Of Course I'm for Monogamy: I'm Also for Everlasting Peace and an End to Taxes (St. Martin's Press) ISBN 9780312146931
- 1996 – The Power of Logical Thinking: Easy Lessons in the Art of Reasoning...and Hard Facts about Its Absence in Our Lives ISBN 9780312139858
- 2000 – The Art of Spelling: The Madness and the Method ISBN 9780393322088
- 2002 – Growing Up: A Classic American Childhood (W. W. Norton) ISBN 9780393051254
