= Sawantwadi (disambiguation) =

Sawantwadi is a town in Sindhudurg district of Maharashtra, India.

It may also refer to:

- Sawantwadi State, state ruled by the Savant Bhonsale dynasty during the British Raj
- Sawantwadi taluka, a taluka (a unit of administration) in the Sindhudurg district in the Indian state of Maharashtra
- Sawantwadi, Mawal, a village in Mawal taluka, Pune district, Maharashtra
- Sawantwadi (Vidhan Sabha constituency), one of the Vidhan Sabha (legislative assembly) constituencies of Maharashtra state in western India
- Sawantwadi Road railway station, a train station on the Konkan Railway
- Sawantwadi toys, hand made works of art made of wood in Sawantwadi

== See also ==
- Savant (disambiguation)
- Samant (disambiguation)
- Wadi (disambiguation)
