= Savant (disambiguation) =

A savant is someone with savant syndrome.

Savant may also refer to:

== Places ==
- Côte de Savant, the Chablis region of Burgundy, France
- Savant Lake, a place in Ontario, Canada

== People ==
- Savant (musician) (born 1987), Norwegian musician
- Doug Savant (born 1964), American actor
- Marilyn vos Savant (born 1946), American author
- Savant Young (born 1976), American professional mixed martial artist

== Arts, entertainment, and media ==
- Savant (DC Comics), a comic book character
- Savant, a 1993 novel by James Follett
- The Savant, an upcoming Apple TV miniseries

== See also ==
- Samant (disambiguation)
- Sawantwadi (disambiguation)
- Prodigy (disambiguation)
