= Samantabhadra =

Samantabhadra (Lit. "All Good", or "Always Auspicious") may refer to:

- Samantabhadra (Bodhisattva), a bodhisattva in Mahayana Buddhism associated with practice and meditation
- Samantabhadra (Tibetan: Kuntu Zangpo), the name of a Buddha, the Adi-Buddha Samantabhadra, in Tibetan Buddhism
- Samantabhadra (Jain monk), second-century Digambara head of the monastic order
- Samantabhadra (Karmole) (1891–1988), Digambara monk
- Samantabhadra Meditation Sutra, a Mahayana Buddhist text teaching meditation and repentance practices

== See also ==
- Samantabhadri (tutelary), female counterpart in Buddhism
- Samant (disambiguation)
- Bhadra (disambiguation)
