= Samant =

Samant may refer to:

- Samanta, a title used in ancient and medieval India
- Samantray, a surname of Indian people

People with the surname Samant:

- Bal Samant, Indian writer
- Dutta Samant, Indian politician
- Keshav Samant, Indian contract bridge player
- Mohan Samant, Indian painter
- Mohan Narayan Rao Samant, Indian naval officer
- Rajeev Samant, Indian businessman
- Satvasheela Samant, Indian linguist
- Uday Samant, Indian politician
- Vaishali Samant, Indian playback singer
- Vinayak Samant, Indian cricketer

== See also ==
- Samantabhadra (disambiguation)
- Sawantwadi (disambiguation)
- Savant (disambiguation)
- Samantasimha (disambiguation)
- Samantaraja, a king of medieval northern India
