= Kevin K. Cheng =

Chinese-American doctor and author

- Education: Kaohsiung Medical College
- Known for: Design of the Phoenix heart
- Medical career
- Profession: dentist
- Institutions: Texas Heart Institute; St. Luke's Hospital, Phoenix

Kevin K. Cheng (born around 1945), developed the Phoenix total artificial heart, first used in a human in 1985 in an emergency in a person whose donor heart was being acutely rejected. Cheng was a dentist by profession and the Phoenix heart he designed was originally developed to be implanted into a young cow. The recipient Thomas Creighton, who was dying from a failing heart, survived the artificial heart operation and 11 hours later a human heart was transplanted. The cause of death less than two days afterwards was not due to the artificial heart.

Cheng had fled China with his family at the age of four, spent his childhood and completed his education in Taiwan and then settled in the United States. His past time of designing artificial hearts took him from Texas to Phoenix, where he developed artificial hearts for transplantation into cows.

== Early life ==
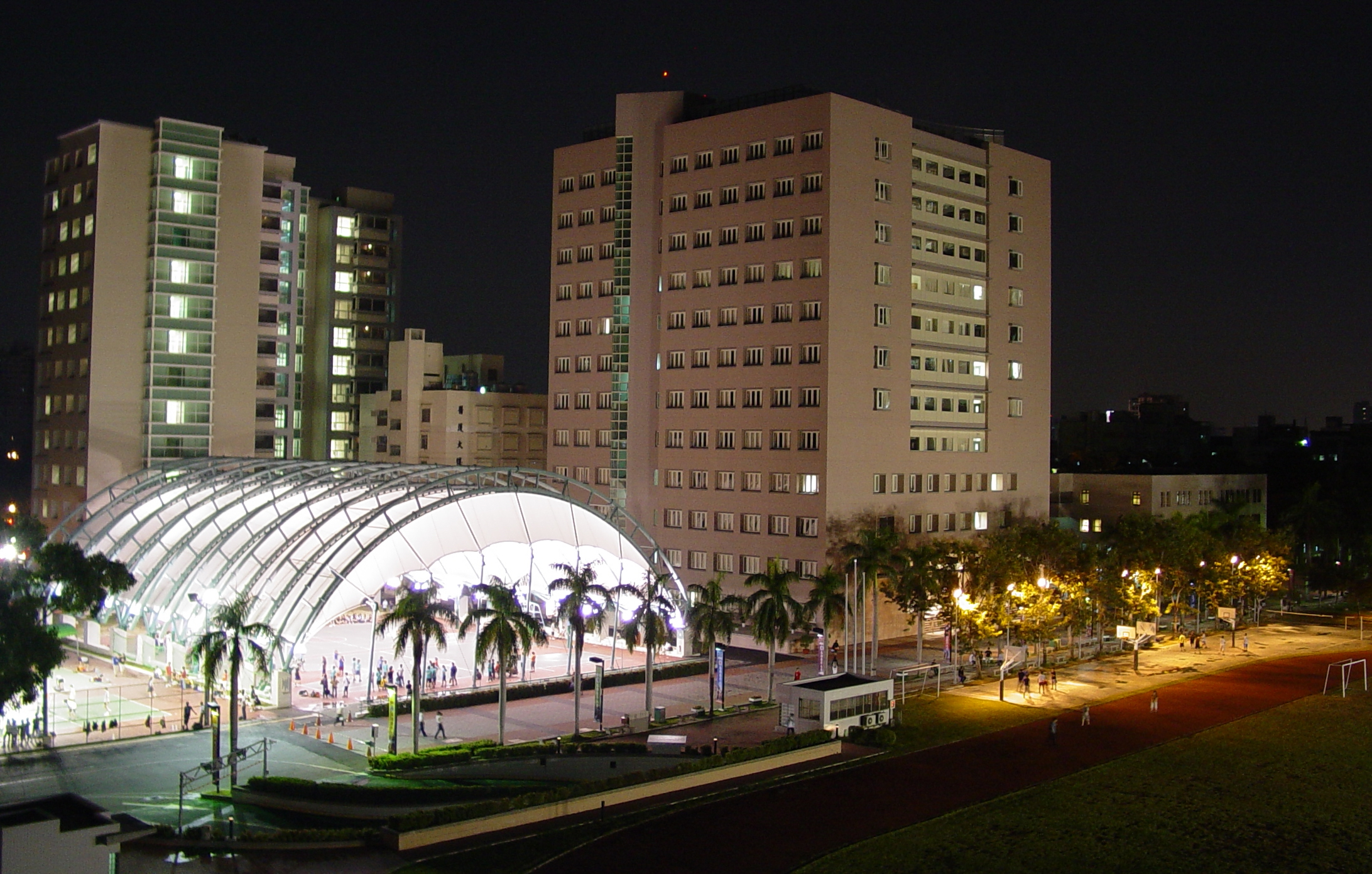
Kaohsiung Medical University

Kevin K. Cheng fled China on a boat with his parents at the age of four. They settled in Taiwan, where he became skilled at drawing, building models and then engineering. He gained admission to study medicine at Kaohsiung Medical College, where dental students and medical students received the same initial education and later in 1973, he moved to Houston, United States. After a few months he found a job as a research associate in the cardiovascular laboratory at the Texas Heart Institute and over the next 30 months he designed and built 36 artificial hearts that were implanted in calves.

In 1978, Cheng decided to go to the University of Texas Dental School in Houston and subsequently moved to the University of Texas at Galveston to work with people with cancer. The whole time, he continued to build and redesign artificial hearts.

== The Phoenix total artificial heart ==
Failing to gain support from the surgeons he spoke to and being unsuccessful in his application for a grant from the National Institutes of Health, he by chance met technician Jon Austin at St. Luke's Hospital, Phoenix and feeling that there may be hope of progressing with his artificial hearts, Cheng moved to Phoenix and opened a general and reconstructive dental clinic. After being introduced to heart surgeon Cecil Vaughn and veterinarian Peter Bates in 1983, Cheng was given space in a laboratory to carry out experimental work. In 1984, Vaughn and Cheng implanted the first Phoenix artificial heart in a calf and subsequently performed another three such procedures, with the longest survival of more than 12 hours.

The next planned artificial heart procedure in 1985, was however cancelled when Vaughn was called to an emergency. Then, on 6 March 1985, Cheng was informed that his artificial heart was needed in desperation by 33-year old Thomas Creighton, 120 miles away at the University of Arizona Medical Center. Creighton had been transplanted a human heart the previous day, by surgeon Jack Copeland, but the donor heart failed.

Cheng, Vaughn and a technician transported the artificial heart via helicopter and chartered jet, from Phoenix airport to the University of Arizona hospital, Phoenix, where Copeland and his team awaited them. Copeland and Vaughn performed the operation and successfully connected the artificial heart in place, leaving the chest open as the Phoenix heart, originally designed to fit into a calf chest, was too big for the chest to be closed after surgery. Sterile wrapping was used to protect the area. Cheng later recounted the time following the procedure and when the Phoenix heart began beating; “Every minute was like a year...I prayed the whole time”. A few hours later, a blood leak from the anastomosis site needed interim surgery with a teflon cuff. 11 hours later, a human heart was used to replace the Phoenix heart. Cheng recalled that upon examination of the Phoenix heart, after its removal from Creighton's chest, showed no evidence of damage with blood clots. The whole episode became a topic of discussion with the FDA.

In 2006, Vaughn published a fictional book The Phoenix Heart, based on the Phoenix artificial heart implantation of 1985, in which he quotes; "There once was a man who had four hearts in three days, and the only one that worked was artificial".

== Selected publications ==
- "Applications Of The Total Artificial Heart In Cardiovascular Research", co-authored with Nagai I, Hongo T, Meador J, Akutsu T, Cardiovascular Disease, 1976;3(4):408-423, PMID 15216143.
- "The Design And Fabrication Of A New Total Artificial Heart", co-authored with James W. Meador, Miguel A. Serrato, and Tetsuzo Akutsu, Cardiovascular Disease, 1977; 4(1): 7–17. PMID 15216130
