= Carrie L. Byington =

- Born: Bryan, Texas, US

Academic background
- Education: BSc, Texas A&M University; MD, Baylor College of Medicine

Carrie L. Byington is a Mexican–American clinician and pediatric infectious disease specialist. In 2016, she became the first Hispanic woman to serve as Dean of a United States medical school upon her appointment at the Texas A&M University.

== Early life and education ==
Byington was born in Bryan, Texas, and raised in South Texas to parents Al and Margot Byington. Her father was a petroleum engineer and her mother was a school teacher. She also had a younger sister, Denise, and brother, Alan. Byington received her Bachelor of Science degree in biology from Texas A&M University in 1985 and her medical degree from Baylor College of Medicine in 1989.

== Career ==
=== University of Utah ===
Upon completing her formal education, Byington joined the University of Utah School of Medicine in 1995 as an assistant professor in general pediatrics and pediatric infectious disease. In this role, Byington helped develop a diagnostic system called FilmArray with BioFire Diagnostics in Salt Lake City, Utah, to determine the cause of fever. By December 2013, Byington was promoted to the role of associate vice president for faculty and academic affairs for Utah's health sciences campus.

As a result of her research, Byington was appointed the co-director of the Center for Clinical and Translational Science at the University of Utah's Health Sciences Department. In this role, she co-authored a study proving newborns of mothers vaccinated against the flu while pregnant had a significantly reduced risk of acquiring influenza during their first six months. In July 2014, Byington was elected the Chair of the American Academy of Pediatrics Committee on Infectious Diseases. During the 2016 Summer Olympics, Byington was selected to lead the United States Olympic Committee's Infectious Disease Advisory Group to provide guidance to athletes and staff traveling to Brazil where the Zika virus was spreading.

=== Texas A&M ===
In 2016, Byington announced her departure from the University of Utah to join Texas A&M University as their Vice Chancellor for Health Services, Dean of the College of Medicine and Senior Vice President for the Health Science Center. She subsequently became the first Hispanic woman to serve as Dean of a United States medical school. Her hiring was described by A&M System Chancellor John Sharp as "one of the most significant hires we have ever made." In her first year as Dean, Byington was elected a member of the National Academy of Medicine as a "rare individual who is an expert in her field, a compassionate medical practitioner and a visionary leader." In the same year, she was also elected a Fellow of the National Academy of Inventors for developing the diagnostic system FilmArray with BioFire Diagnostics.

During her second year as Dean of Texas A&M, Byington was inducted into their Academy of Distinguished Former Students for her national recognition in both general pediatrics and pediatric infectious diseases.

=== University of California ===
On July 18, 2019, Byington left Texas A&M to become the next Executive Vice President of University of California Health (UCH), where she oversees UC's six academic medical centers, a community-based health system, and 20 health professional schools.

== Personal life ==
Byington and her husband are beekeepers.
