= Samantasimha =

Samantasimha may refer to:

- Samantasimha (Chahamana), 13th century Chamahana ruler of Jalore
- Samantasimha (Guhila), 12th century Guhila ruler of Mewar

== See also ==
- Samant (disambiguation)
- Simha (disambiguation)
