= William DeVries =

American physician (born 1943)

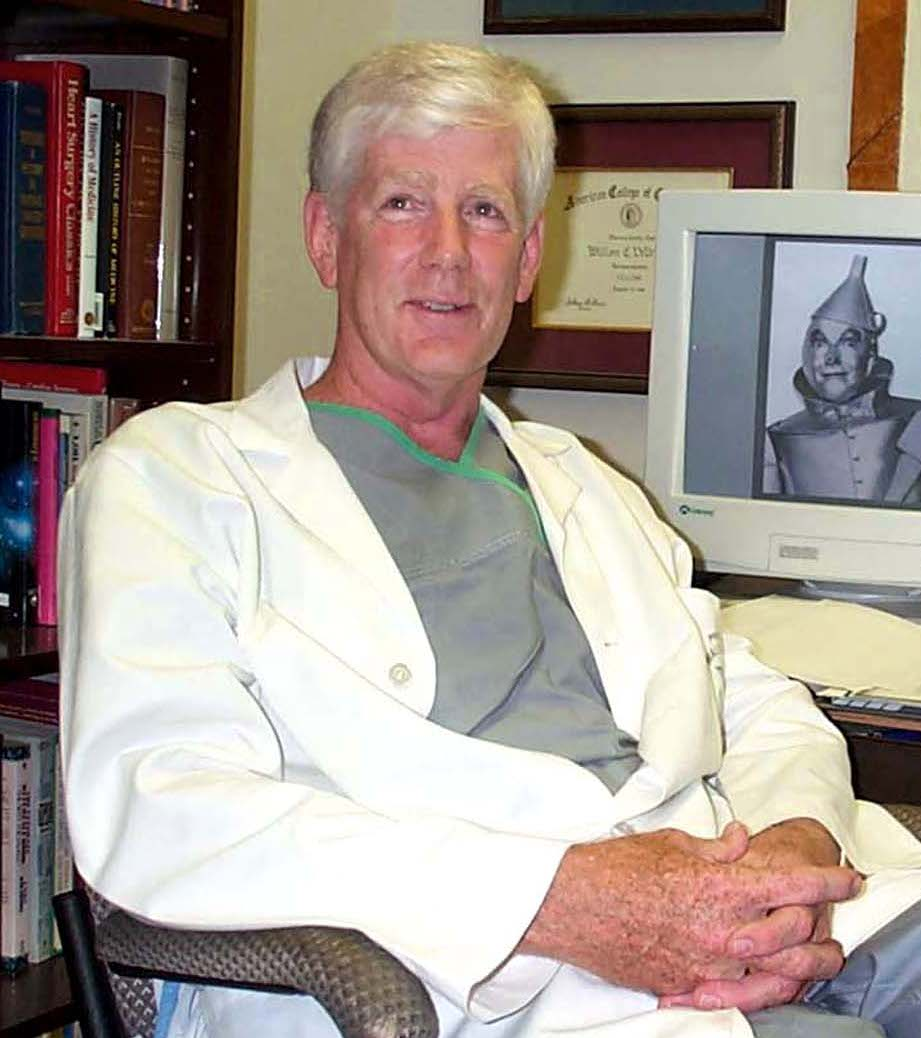
- DeVries in 2002
- Pronunciation: /dəˈvriːz/
- Born: William Castle DeVries; December 19, 1943 (age 82); Brooklyn, New York, U.S.
- Known for: Dr. William DeVries and his surgical team replaced a diseased heart with the Jarvik-7, the first permanent artificial heart ever used for a human patient.
- Scientific career
- Fields: cardiothoracic surgeon

William Castle DeVries (born December 19, 1943) is an American cardiothoracic surgeon, mainly known for the first transplant of a TAH (total artificial heart) using the Jarvik-7 model.

== Early years and medical school ==
William DeVries was born December 19, 1943, in Brooklyn Navy Yard. His father, Henry DeVries, was a Dutch immigrant who died in combat on the destroyer USS Kalk (DD-611) in 1944 during the Battle of Hollandia, where he had enrolled as a naval surgeon. When his father died William was only six months old. He was raised by his grandmother and his mother who was a member of the Church of Jesus Christ of Latter-day Saints until he was five. After his mother remarried, the family was enlarged by eight more children and they all moved to Ogden, Utah, where he attended Ben Lomond High School and where he was an athlete being on the basketball and track teams. During his childhood DeVries became an Eagle Scout. Because the family was meeting financial difficulties, William had to work throughout his high school years to help out. He also won the Utah state finals in high jumping and thanks to his sport abilities he went to the University of Utah on a track scholarship. During college he was part of the Sigma Chi fraternity. He graduated in 1966 with a bachelor's degree in molecular and Genetic biology. Later on he went to medical school also at the University of Utah and received his M.D. degree in 1970.

By the time he had finished with school, he had already built a family. He married his first wife, Ane Karen, during the last year of college and had four children. During college he was able to hold down three or four jobs and yet he graduated top of his class and received the award for the most outstanding graduate.

It was thanks to one of the jobs that he was involved in surgery. He assisted doctor Willem Johan Kolff during his work and during night he was paid to watch over the animals in the lab. In 1969 after some advice from doctor Keith Reemtsma, he decided to leave Salt Lake City and to start his residency in another hospital. That is also the year in which doctor Denton Cooley attempted his first artificial heart transplant in a patient, in Houston. Doctor Cooley's work would be an inspiration for doctor DeVries, who would later succeed in the transplant of the TAH. After he left Utah, he attended a series of job interviews. The first one was at the Massachusetts General Hospital in Boston. The day of the interview, on his way to the hospital, he witnessed a person being stabbed by another man, and helped the victim until he was carried to the emergency room. This episode was probably one of the reasons why he decided not to start his residency in Boston. The second interview he attended was at the Johns Hopkins hospital, but eventually he opted for a residency at the Duke University in North Carolina. At the end of his nine years surgical training, he headed back to Salt Lake City.

== The artificial heart ==
In 1979 Doctor DeVries went back to the University of Utah to become the chairman of thoracic and cardiovascular surgery; there, he used to perform two to five open-heart operations a week. At that time the university was known for being one of the country's few pioneering centers for advanced surgery on vital organs and their transplanting and implanting into animals and humans. In Salt Lake City he worked with doctor Robert Jarvik and doctor Kolff. By the time DeVries was back to Salt Lake City, the calves with artificial heart were able to live up to six, seven, even eight months. These results inspired him to take on with the work and so he started a series of long-term animal experiments. After two years of experiments, doctor DeVries and his colleagues tried to obtain the U.S. Food and Drug Administration (FDA) and the National Institutes of Health (NIH) approval. At the beginning, nobody really paid much consideration to the work, but after a while it started to acquire new attention, things changed, and even the NIH started to be interested in the project. Therefore, DeVries started to look for a suitable patient for the first attempt. In 1982, the FDA gave the approval to experiment the device on a human, and so a panel of six members at the University of Utah Medical Center started searching for a patient. DeVries was the only surgeon authorized by the FDA to perform the artificial heart implant. The group was composed of two cardiologists, a psychiatrist, a nurse, a social worker and DeVries; the decision had to be unanimous.

== The first patient ==
The first patient was a Seattle dental surgeon named Barney Clark, affected with an end-stage congestive heart failure. The seven-hour surgery was carried out on December 2, 1982, and it was successful. Doctor William DeVries, 38 years old at that time, was known to listen occasionally to rock music while performing surgery. In his first Jarvik-7 implant the operating room was hushed, except for the voice communications to the medical team and the quietly played strains of Joseph-Maurice Ravel's "Boléro". The patient lived, but DeVries found much harder to manage the device on a patient rather than on a healthy animal. This carried to some complications which led part of the researchers to ask DeVries to turn off the device. In fact they did not want to lose the NIH approval and consequently their funds. DeVries refused to shut down the device, this caught the attention of the media, and made DeVries achieve the cover of Time magazine (December 10, 1984). Eventually, they had to deal with the issue of money. To keep Mr. Clark alive, he decided to sell the rights of his story to a newspaper for $1 million . Mr. Clark lived for 112 days after the surgery, as complications kept occurring and this led to multiorgan failure and eventually death. Unfortunately Mr. Clark never recovered well enough to leave the hospital. In this period DeVries and his team had to face a series of issues due to the pressure of the media and the public. He was constantly obsessed with critics and legal issues concerning about what he was doing whether it was right or wrong. With the success of the first patient, DeVries wanted to go on with his trials, but there were not enough funds and medical insurance was never going to pay for such an experimental transplant. Consequently, DeVries found himself on a quest for fund raising, which, at the beginning did not succeed until Wendell Cherry, vice chairman of the Humana Inc. offered him to relocate in Louisville, Kentucky; in exchange Cherry offered to finance the next 100 implants.

=== The Jarvik-7 ===
The Jarvik-7 was a mechanical device, made of polyurethane and aluminium, which was used to replace the two ventricles of a human heart.

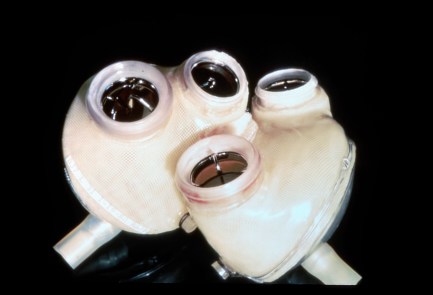
Jarvik-7 artificial heart

The pumping action came from air, compressed by an electrical unit located outside of the patient's body. The human-made organ had two separate ventricles grafted with Dacron sleeves to the native atria and great vessels. It was powered by a 400-pound (180 kg) air compressor, connected to the heart, through a tube coming out of the patient body. In order to give the patients the ability to move, it was also invented a portable power console which was the size of a briefcase. Since 1982, 350 patients have used the Jarvik-7 heart model, and its original design is still used for the modern Jarvik-7, although due to propriety passages the device name is now "SynCardia". In October 2004, the Jarvik-7 model was the first medical device to receive a full-FDA approval.

== In Louisville, Kentucky ==
After the offer from Wendell Cherry, DeVries decided to move to Louisville in order to continue with his work on the TAH although he knew that the reason why the Humana Inc. had given him such a generous offer was mainly due to the publicity that this project was to offer them. "Our name is now on every single newspaper in the world. This is the type of advertisement that you cannot buy. As far as I am concerned, you have made your money for the next hundred patients" (Wendell Cherry). And even knowing this, DeVries accepted the deal because it was for medical advancement.

Bill Schroeder was his second candidate. The patient survived through the surgery, and initially did so well that when president Ronald Reagan phoned him, a week after the implant, he asked why his social security check was late. Unfortunately two weeks later mister Schroeder suffered of a series of infections and strokes that left him unable to speak. He lived for 620 days after the operation, during which he was able to leave the hospital and do a series of normal activities like traveling, attending a basketball game and even fishing. Over the following years DeVries implanted a total of four artificial-hearts, and always had someone with a TAH in his facility.

Thanks to his work, the TAH was used in many hospitals, not as a permanent solution for diseased heart patient, but as a "bridge" in order to assist the heart and wait for a final transplant.

In 1983, DeVries received the Golden Plate Award of the American Academy of Achievement.

During 1987, 49 diseased hearts had been substituted by surgeons all over the world with a Jarvik-7 model. In January 1988 DeVries was close to performing his fifth implantation, when a human donor heart was found for the patient. In January 1990 the approval was withdrawn, and the FDA ended the program. Before his retirement, in 1999, doctor DeVries decided, in 1988, to go back to traditional cardiovascular surgery. On December 29, 2000, he joined the United States Army Reserve as a lieutenant colonel, becoming at age 57 one of the oldest people to enter and complete the Officer Basic Course. After completion of that course, he was stationed at Walter Reed Army Medical Center in Washington D.C. teaching surgical residents there and medical students from the Uniformed Services University of the Health Sciences and the George Washington University School of Medicine.

Collections of DeVries papers are held at the National Library of Medicine in Bethesda, Maryland.

== Media attention ==
Throughout his career, DeVries had to face a series of philosophical, religious, and practical objections to the artificial heart program. The media attention to the first implant was the largest ever directed to a medical case. Never before had a medical innovation aroused such a contentious debate. Throughout the time between the implant and the death of Barney Clark, the media followed the case so intensively that teams of reporters and television crews besieged the medical center, hankering for information on the patient. Criticism came not only from the medical world, but also from the public. Indeed, many people were disturbed by the idea of replacing the heart, considering it to have special and emotional meanings which could not be substituted by any human-made machine. The question asked by Una Loy, the wife of Barney Clark, is an example of this skepticism. Before her husband underwent surgery, she asked the doctor if after the transplant her husband would still be able to love her. Many were also disturbed by the fact that Clark was never able to leave the hospital. His life was extended somewhat, but he spent it in bed. The New York Times questioned whether the artificial heart research was useful or just a "Dracula" sucking funds away from other programs. DeVries felt that all this attention was slowing his work in Utah, and so decided to leave Salt Lake City for a position in Louisville. Thanks to the Humana Inc. funds, DeVries implanted another artificial heart at the Humana Human Heart Institute International in a patient called Bill Schroeder. The whole case was followed by the media, and DeVries and the Humana were accused of publicity seeking; Life magazine called it "the Bill Schroeder's show". After the death of DeVries' second patient, the critics began to charge that the mechanical heart brought more complications than benefits. In fact, both Clark and Schroeder never fully recovered from the surgery and eventually died due to complications. DeVries felt that the best way to concede the dilemma was to have people understand that the TAH was not a permanent solution but just a temporary substitution for a diseased heart.

== Publications ==
- DeVries, WC; Kwan-Gett, CS; Kolff, WJ (1970). "Consumptive coagulopathy, shock, and the artificial heart". Trans Am Soc Artif Intern Organs. 16: 29–36. PMID 5454179.
- Alexander, LG; DeVries, WC; Anderson, RW (1973). "Airway pressure and pulmonary edema formation". Surg Forum. 24: 231–4. PMID 4618644.
- DeVries, WC; Anderson, RW; Wolfe, WG; Alexander, LG (1973). "Pulmonary capillary filtration following oxygen exposure". Surg Forum. 24: 224–5. PMID 4805992.
- Duranceau, A; DeVries, WC; Wolfe, WG; Sabiston, DC (1974). "Ventilatory dead space in diagnosis of acute pulmonary embolism". Surg Forum. 25: 229–31. PMID 4439171.
- Wolfe, WG; Devries, WC; Anderson, RW; Sabiston, DC (April 1974). "Changes in pulmonary capillary filtration and ventilatory dead space during exposure to 95 per cent oxygen". J. Surg. Res. 16: 312–7. PMID 4827935.
- Wolfe, WG; DeVries, WC (1975). "Oxygen toxicity". Annu. Rev. Med. 26: 203–17. doi:10.1146/annurev.me.26.020175.001223. PMID 807148.
- DeVries, WC; Anderson, RW (1975). "Physiologic and pathologic responses of the pulmonary circulation to high flow shunts". Surg Forum. 26: 208–11. PMID 1216112.
- DeVries, WC; Seaber, AV; Sealy, WC (February 1979). "Unilateral pulmonary emphysema created by ligation of the left pulmonary artery in newborn puppies". Ann. Thorac. Surg. 27: 154–60. PMID 453973.
- Anderson, RW; DeVries, WC (April 1976). "Transvascular fluid and protein dynamics in the lung following hemorrhagic shock". J. Surg. Res. 20: 281–90. PMID 933482.
- Crapo, RO; Crapo, JD; Morris, AH; Berlin, SL; Devries, WC (May 1980). "Pulmonary tissue volume in isolated perfused dog lungs". J Appl Physiol. 48: 799–801. PMID 7451289.
- DeVries, WC; Wolfe, WG (August 1980). "The management of spontaneous pneumothorax and bullous emphysema". Surg. Clin. North Am. 60: 851–66. PMID 7423365.
- Olsen, DB; Devries, WC; Oyer, PE; et al. (1981). "Artificial heart implantation, later cardiac transplantation in the calf". Trans Am Soc Artif Intern Organs. 27: 132–6. PMID 7036495.
- Jarvik, RK; Kessler, TR; McGill, LD; et al. (1981). "Determinants of pannus formation in long-surviving artificial heart calves, and its prevention". Trans Am Soc Artif Intern Organs. 27: 90–6. PMID 7331167.
- Olsen, DB; DeVries, WC; Kolff, J; Frazier, OH; Rahimtoola, SH (1982). "Indeterminate circulatory support with the artificial heart". Trans Am Soc Artif Intern Organs. 28: 652–5. PMID 7164318.
- Morton, WA; DeVries, WC; Dobelle, WH; Serkes, KD; Sheridan, R; Dennis, C (1983). "Impact of regulations on artificial organs research". Trans Am Soc Artif Intern Organs. 29: 770–3. PMID 6673323.
- Joyce, LD; DeVries, WC; Hastings, WL; Olsen, DB; Jarvik, RK; Kolff, WJ (1983). "Response of the human body to the first permanent implant of the Jarvik-7 Total Artificial Heart". Trans Am Soc Artif Intern Organs. 29: 81–7. PMID 6673327.
- DeVries, WC; Joyce, LD (1983). "The artificial heart". Clin Symp. 35: 1–32. PMID 6546047.
- "Clinical Use of the Total Artificial Heart"; William C. DeVries, M.D., Jeffrey L. Anderson, M.D., Lyle D. Joyce, M.D., Fred L. Anderson, M.D., Elizabeth H. Hammond, M.D., Robert K. Jarvik, M.D., and Willem J. Kolff, M.D., Ph.D.; February 2, 1984; "The New England Journal of Medicine".
- Raymond, J; DeVries, WC; Joyce, LD (May 1984). "Nutrition for the first Total Artificial Heart patient: implications for future patients". J Am Diet Assoc. 84: 532–5. PMID 6425392.
- Anderson, FL; DeVries, WC; Anderson, JL; Joyce, LD (August 1984). "Evaluation of total artificial heart performance in man". Am. J. Cardiol. 54: 394–8. PMID 6465023.
- Hastings, WL; Mays, JB; Elzy, P; DeVries, WC (1985). "Preparing an institution for clinical device experimentation". Trans Am Soc Artif Intern Organs. 31: 90–4. PMID 3837541.
- DeVries, WC (1985). "The ethical implications of the artificial heart: an interview with Dr. William DeVries". Rev Fed Am Hosp. 18: 25–6, 28. PMID 10271372.
- Taylor, A; Milton, W; Christian, PE; Datz, FL; Joyce, L; DeVries, WC (June 1985). "The role of nuclear imaging in the management of the first total artificial heart recipient". Clin Nucl Med. 10: 427–31. PMID 4017394.
- Levinson, MM; Copeland, JG; Smith, RG; et al. (1986). "Indexes of hemolysis in human recipients of the Jarvik-7 total artificial heart: a cooperative report of fifteen patients". J Heart Transplant. 5: 236–48. PMID 3612356.
- Joyce, LD; Johnson, KE; Pierce, WS; et al. (1986). "Summary of the world experience with clinical use of total artificial hearts as heart support devices". J Heart Transplant. 5: 229–35. PMID 3302170.
- Jarvik, RK; DeVries, WC; Semb, BK; et al. (1986). "Surgical positioning of the Jarvik-7 artificial heart". J Heart Transplant. 5: 184–95. PMID 3612355.
- Yared, SF; Johnson, GS; DeVries, WC (June 1986). "Results of artificial heart implantation in man". Transplant. Proc. 18: 69–74. PMID 3521002.
- Mays, JB; Hastings, WL; Williams, MA; Barker, LE; DeVries, WC (1986). "Drive system management of emergency conditions in three permanent total artificial heart patients". ASAIO Trans. 32: 221–5. PMID 3778716.
- Murray, KD; Abbott, T; DeVries, WC; Gaykowski, R; Olsen, DB (1986). "The microscopic evaluation of skin buttons used in a long-term human total artificial heart recipient". ASAIO Trans. 32: 42–5. PMID 3778747.
- Mays, JB; Williams, MA; Barker, LE; Hastings, WL; DeVries, WC (September 1986). "Diagnostic monitoring and drive system management of patients with total artificial heart". Heart Lung. 15: 466–75. PMID 3639075.
- Schwab, TR; Edwards, BS; DeVries, WC; Zimmerman, RS; Burnett, JC (November 1986). "Atrial endocrine function in humans with artificial hearts". N. Engl. J. Med. 315: 1398–401. doi:10.1056/NEJM198611273152207. PMID 2945989.
- Girardet, RE; Masri, ZH; Barbie, RN; et al. (1986). "Vein graft arteriovenous fistula for long-term venous access in a heart transplant recipient lacking superficial veins: a case report". J Heart Transplant. 5: 484–5. PMID 3302183.
- Datz, FL; Christian, PE; Taylor, A; Hastings, WL; DeVries, WC (1987). "Multigated radionuclide study of the total artificial heart". Eur J Nucl Med. 13: 167–70. PMID 3622562.
- Ward, RA; Wellhausen, SR; Dobbins, JJ; Johnson, GS; DeVries, WC (1987). "Thromboembolic and infectious complications of total artificial heart implantation". Ann. N. Y. Acad. Sci. 516: 638–50. PMID 3439750.
- Stelzer, GT; Ward, RA; Wellhausen, SR; McLeish, KR; Johnson, GS; DeVries, WC (February 1987). "Alterations in select immunologic parameters following total artificial heart implantation". Artif Organs. 11: 52–62. PMID 3566584.
- Mays, JB; Williams, MA; Jung, S; Frederick, MG; Barker, LE; DeVries, WC (1987). "A clinical estimation model for noninvasive determination of atrial pressure in total artificial heart patients". ASAIO Trans. 33: 726–31. PMID 3676010.
- Dobbins, JJ; Johnson, GS; Kunin, CM; DeVries, WC (February 1988). "Postmortem microbiological findings of two total artificial heart recipients". JAMA. 259: 865–9. PMID 3121874.
- DeVries, WC (February 1988). "Surgical technique for implantation of the Jarvik-7-100 total artificial heart". JAMA. 259: 875–80. PMID 3275826.
- Gristina, AG; Dobbins, JJ; Giammara, B; Lewis, JC; DeVries, WC (February 1988). "Biomaterial-centered sepsis and the total artificial heart. Microbial adhesion vs tissue integration". JAMA. 259: 870–4. PMID 3336200.
- DeVries, WC (February 1988). "The permanent artificial heart. Four case reports". JAMA. 259: 849–59. PMID 3336198.
- DeVries, WC (February 1988). "The physician, the media, and the 'spectacular' case". JAMA. 259: 886–90. PMID 3275827.
- Wellhausen, SR; Ward, RA; Johnson, GS; DeVries, WC (1988). "Immunologic complications of long-term implantation of a total artificial heart". J Clin Immunol. 8: 307–18. PMID 3261735.
- Zenger, GH; DeVries, WC (July 1988). "The role of nuclear medicine in three permanent total artificial heart recipients". Semin Nucl Med. 18: 241–5. PMID 3175681.
- Joyce, LD; Johnson, KE; Cabrol, C; et al. (1988). "Nine year experience with the clinical use of total artificial hearts as cardiac support devices". ASAIO Trans. 34: 703–7. PMID 3058184.
- Copeland, JG; Harker, LA; Joist, JH; DeVries, WC (January 1989). "Circulatory Support 1988. Bleeding and anticoagulation". Ann. Thorac. Surg. 47: 87–95. PMID 2912399.
- "Cardiorespiratory Interactions in Aatients with an Artificial Heart"; Robotham J.L., Mays J.B., Williams M.A., DeVries W.C.; October 1990; Department of Anesthesiology and Critical Care, Johns Hopkins Hospital, Baltimore, Maryland; "Anesthesiology: The Journal of the American Society of Anestesiologists, Inc."
- "Repair of Anomalous Origin of Right Coronary Artery from the Left Sinus of Valsalva"; Houman Tavaf-Motamen, Sean P. Bannister, Philip C. Corcoran, Robert W. Stewart, Charles R. Mulligan, and William C. DeVries; June 2008; Division of Cardiothoracic Surgery, Walter Reed Army Medical Center, Washington DC; "The Annals of Thoracic Surgery"
- "Chondrosarcoma Masquerading as Cardiomyopathy"; Charles R. Mulligan Jr, Houman Tavaf-Motamen, Robert Stewart, and William C. Devries; July 2008; Division of Cardiothoracic Surgery, Walter Reed Army Medical Center, Washington DC; "The Annals of Thoracic Surgery"
- Welling, DR; Rich, NM; Burris, DG; Boffard, KD; Devries, WC (September 2008). "Who was William Ray Rumel?". World J Surg. 32: 2122–5. doi:10.1007/s00268-008-9599-4. PMID 18443854.

== Sources ==
- Cooper David K.C."Open Heart: The Radical Surgeons who Revolutionized Medicine." 2010, New York, Kaplan Publishing.ISBN 978-1-60714-490-8
- DeVries, William C. (February 2, 1984). "Clinical Use of the Total Artificial Heart". The New England Journal of Medicine. 310 (5): 273–278. doi:10.1056/NEJM198402023100501. PMID 6690950.
- Jarvik Heart, Inc.; "Robert Jarvik on the Jarvik-7"; accessdate November 19, 2012
- U.S. National Library of Medicine, National Institutes of Health; "PubMed"; accessdate January 4, 2013
- Sandeep, Jauhar (February 5, 2004). "The Artificial Heart". The New England Journal of Medicine. 350 (6): 542–544. doi:10.1056/NEJMp038244. PMID 14762180.
- Webster, Bayard (December 3, 1982). "Men in the News; a Pair of Skilled Hands to Guide an Artificial Heart: Robert Kiffler Jarvik". The New York Times.
- YourDictionary, n.d. Web; "William Castle DeVries."; Retrieved November 21, 2012.
