= Clifford Kwan-Gett =

Chinese American engineer and physician

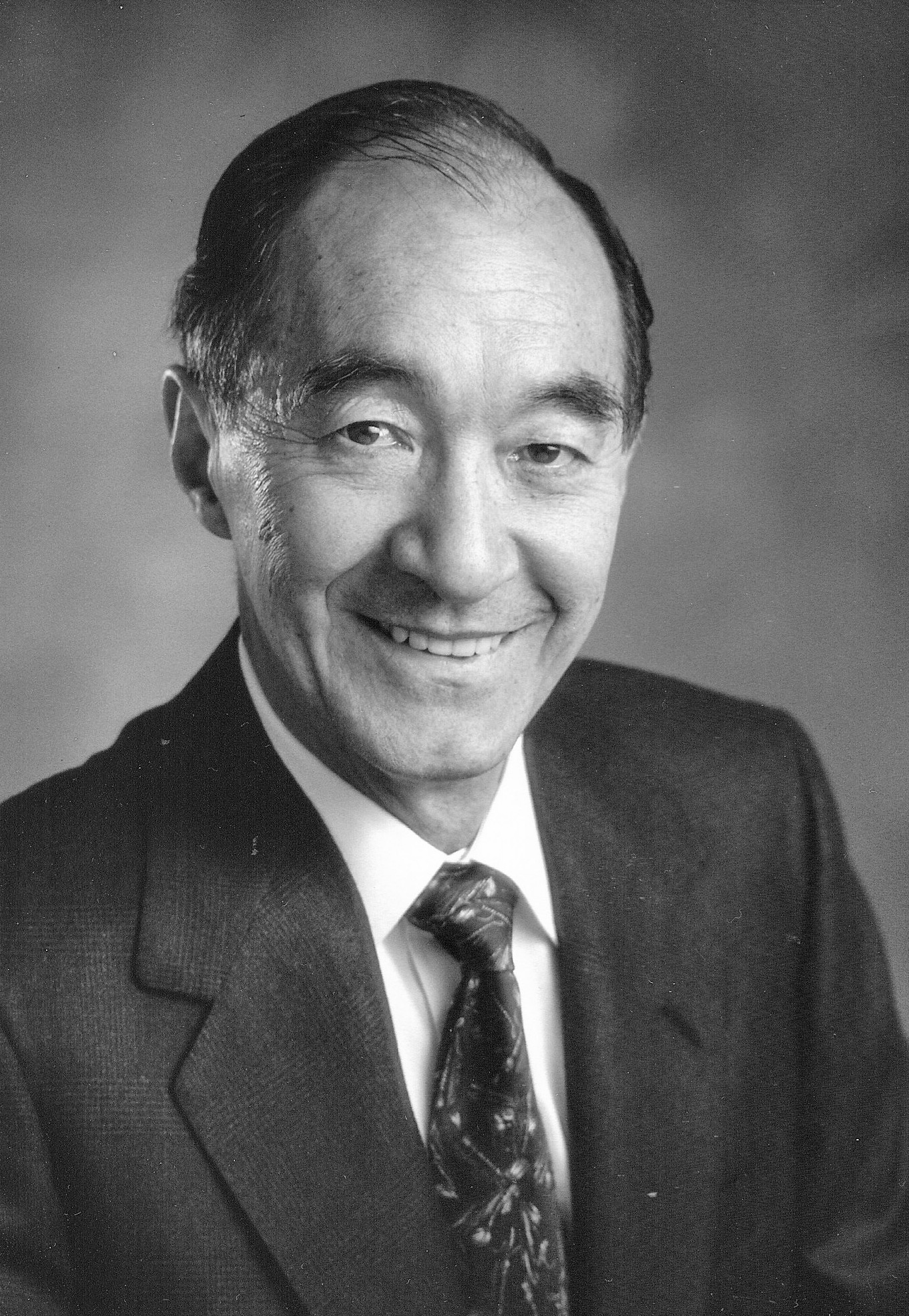
- Born: 1934 (age 91–92); Emmaville, NSW, Australia
- Occupations: Engineer, cardiovascular thoracic surgeon, inventor

Clifford Stanley Kwan-Gett (born 1934) is an Australian-born Chinese American engineer, physician, and artificial heart pioneer.

Kwan-Gett was born Clifford Gett in Emmaville, New South Wales, a small tin mining town in the Australian bush. His father Walter Gett owned the Yow Sing & Co. General Store in Emmaville. Kwan-Gett was the eighth of ten children and the first in his family to attend college. At the University of Sydney, while a resident in Wesley College, he obtained degrees in Science and Engineering and later in Medicine. He married Joo Een Tan, then adopted his Chinese family name by changing his surname from Gett to Kwan-Gett.

In 1966 Kwan-Gett went to the Cleveland Clinic to do artificial heart research as a fellow with Dr. Yuki Nose. In 1967 Kwan-Gett moved to Salt Lake City, Utah with Dr. Willem J. Kolff to establish a new Division of Artificial Organs at the University of Utah. During his tenure as director of engineering and the sole surgeon with the artificial heart program at the University of Utah from 1967 to 1971, Kwan-Gett invented a pneumatically powered total artificial heart system. An important advance of this system was the ability to mimic "Starling's Law," which describes the natural heart's ability to vary the blood volume of each beat depending on the pressures in the upper chambers of the heart. Kwan-Gett's system was the first to use completely passive filling of the artificial heart's ventricles in a way that automatically balanced blood flow between the left and right ventricles without using complex control systems. Another innovation of the Kwan-Gett heart was the use of hemispherical non-distensible pumping diaphragms that did not crush red blood cells against the walls of the heart.

In 1971 Kwan-Gett left full-time research to pursue fellowship and residency training at the University of Utah. He became board certified in both thoracic surgery and general surgery. Kwan-Gett practiced cardiovascular thoracic surgery in Salt Lake City and remained active in the artificial organs research community there. He retired in 1995 and moved to San Diego, where he now lives.
