= Samantabhadra (Karmole) =

Muni Samantabhadra Ji Maharaj

Personal life
- Born: Devchand Kasturchand Shah; 1891 Karmala. Maharashtra
- Died: 1988 (aged 96–97)

Religious life
- Religion: Jainism
- Sect: Digambara

Samantabhadra (1891–1988) was a Digambara monk.

Founder of Jain Gurukul Education system Gurudev 108 Shri Samantabhadra was born in Karmala, Maharashtra on 19 December 1891. Birth name was Devchand Kasturchand Shah.
