= William J. Schroeder =

American stroke victim who received the Jarvik 7 artificial heart in 1984

- Born: February 14, 1932; Jasper, Indiana, United States
- Died: August 7, 1986 (aged 54); Louisville, Kentucky, United States
- Burial place: Fairview Cemetery, Jasper, Indiana, United States
- Known for: Second permanent human recipient of a Jarvik-7, at the time the longest-surviving recipient of a permanent artificial heart

William J. Schroeder (February 14, 1932 – August 7, 1986), was one of the first recipients of an artificial heart. Schroeder was born in Jasper, Indiana, and was a Sergeant in the United States Air Force from 1952 to 1966. On November 25, 1984, at the age of 52, became the second human recipient of the Jarvik-7. The transplant was performed at Humana Heart Institute International in Louisville, Kentucky by Dr. William C. DeVries.

== Death ==
After 18 days, he suffered the first of a series of strokes, eventually leaving him in a vegetative state. He died on August 7, 1986, at 1:35PM of a lung infection, a year and 255 days (620 days) after receiving the Jarvik 7. This was the longest that anyone had survived with an artificial heart at that time.

The headstone marking Schroeder's grave is made of black granite in the shape of two overlapping hearts. One is laser engraved with an image of the Jarvik 7.

== Sources ==
Barnette, Martha (1987). The Bill Schroeder story. New York: Morrow. ISBN 0-688-06893-6.
