= Sawantwadi toys =

Sawantwadi toys refers to hand made works of art made of wood in Sawantwadi a town in Sindhudurg district of Maharashtra, an Indian state. It is reported that the makers of these toys face the challenge of competition from mass-produced cheap Chinese products.

== Geographical indication registration ==
A 2010 news story reports of attempts to obtain Geographical indication registration for the toys.
