= Willem Johan Kolff =

Dutch medical researcher (1911–2009)

- Born: February 14, 1911; Leiden, Netherlands
- Died: February 11, 2009 (aged 97); Newtown Square, Pennsylvania, U.S.
- Awards: Cameron Prize for Therapeutics of the University of Edinburgh (1964); Gairdner Foundation International Award (1966); Harvey Prize (1972); Wilhelm Exner Medal (1980); Japan Prize (1986)
- Scientific career
- Thesis: De kunstmatige nier (1946)
- Doctoral advisor: Robert Brinkman
- Doctoral students: Robert Jarvik

Willem Johan "Pim" Kolff (February 14, 1911 – February 11, 2009) was a pioneer of hemodialysis, artificial heart, as well as in the entire field of artificial organs. Willem was a member of the Kolff family, an old Dutch patrician family. He made his major discoveries in the field of dialysis for kidney failure during the Second World War. He emigrated in 1950 to the United States, where he obtained US citizenship in 1955, and received a number of awards and widespread recognition for his work.

== Netherlands ==
Born in Leiden, Netherlands, Kolff was the eldest of a family of 5 boys. Kolff studied medicine in his hometown at Leiden University, and continued as a resident in internal medicine at Groningen University. One of his first patients was a 22-year-old man who was slowly dying of chronic kidney failure. This prompted Kolff to perform research on artificial renal function replacement. Also during his residency, Kolff organized the first blood bank in Europe (in 1940). Kolff's first prototype dialyzer was developed in 1943, built from orange juice cans, used auto parts, and sausage casings. Over a two-year span, Kolff had attempted to treat 15 people with his machine, but all had died. In 1945, Kolff successfully treated his first patient, a 67-year-old woman, from kidney failure using his hemodialysis machine.

During World War II, he was in Kampen, where he was active in the resistance against the German occupation. Simultaneously, Kolff developed the first functioning artificial kidney. He treated his first patient in 1943, and in 1945 he was able to save a patient's life with hemodialysis treatment. In 1946 he obtained a PhD degree summa cum laude at University of Groningen on the subject. It marks the start of a treatment that has saved the lives of millions of acute kidney injury or chronic kidney failure patients ever since.

== United States ==
When the war ended, Kolff donated his artificial kidneys to other hospitals to spread familiarity with the technology. In Europe, Kolff sent machines to London, Amsterdam, and Poland. Another machine sent to Dr. Isidore Snapper at Mount Sinai Hospital in New York City was used to perform the first human dialysis in the United States on January 26, 1948 under the supervision of Drs. Alfred P. Fishman and Irving Kroop.

In 1950, Kolff left the Netherlands to seek opportunities in the US. At the Cleveland Clinic, he was involved in the development of heart-lung machines to maintain heart and pulmonary function during cardiac surgery. He also improved on his dialysis machine. At Brigham and Women's Hospital, with funding from New York real estate developer David Rose he developed the first production artificial kidney, the Kolff Brigham Artificial Kidney, manufactured by the Edward A. Olson Co. in Boston Massachusetts, and later the Travenol Twin-Coil Artificial Kidney.

He became head of the University of Utah's Division of Artificial Organs and Institute for Biomedical Engineering in 1967, where he was involved in the development of the artificial heart, the first of which was implanted in 1982 in patient Barney Clark, who survived for four months, with the heart still functioning at the time of Clark's death.

In 1976 Kolff became a corresponding member of the Royal Netherlands Academy of Arts and Sciences.

== Impact ==
Kolff is considered to be the Father of Artificial Organs, and is regarded as one of the most important physicians of the 20th century. He obtained more than 12 honorary doctorates at universities all over the world, and more than 120 international awards, among them the Cameron Prize for Therapeutics of the University of Edinburgh in 1964, the Golden Plate Award of the American Academy of Achievement in 1971, the Harvey Prize in 1972, AMA Scientific Achievement Award in 1982, the Japan Prize in 1986, the Albert Lasker Award for Clinical Medical Research in 2002 the Russ Prize in 2003. In 1990 Life Magazine included him in its list of the 100 Most Important Persons of the 20th Century. He was a co-nominee with William H. Dobelle for the Nobel Prize in Physiology or Medicine in 2003. Robert Jarvik, who worked in Kolff's laboratory at the University of Utah beginning in 1971, credited Kolff with inspiring him to develop the first permanent artificial heart. Theodor Kolobow, the inventor of the silicone spiral coil membrane lung and pioneer of artificial organ development, was inspired by Kolff.

Kolff died three days short of his 98th birthday on February 11, 2009, in a care center in Philadelphia. On February 29, 2012, Yad Vashem recognized Willem Johan Kolff and his wife as Righteous Among the Nations, for their part in concealing a Jewish medical colleague and his son.

In April 2019, a life-sized bronze memorial bust of Kolff, created by Canadian sculptor Ryan Kurylo, was permanently installed at the Kolff Institute for Biomedical Engineering and Materials Science on the campus of the University of Groningen in the Netherlands.

== Sources ==
- Paul Heiney. The Nuts and Bolts of Life: Willem Kolff and the Invention of the Kidney Machine. Sutton Publishing, 2003. ISBN 0-7509-2896-4.
- Herman Broers. Inventor for Life: The Story of W. J. Kolff, Father of Artificial Organs. B&V Media, 2007. ISBN 90-78430-01-X.
- Patrick T. McBride, Genesis of the artificial kidney. Baxter Healthcare Corp., 1987.
