= Barney Clark (patient) =

American dentist who received the first Jarvik-7 artificial heart

- Born: January 21, 1921; Provo, Utah, United States
- Died: March 23, 1983 (aged 62); Salt Lake City, Utah, United States
- Known for: First permanent human recipient of the Jarvik-7

Barney Bailey Clark (January 21, 1921 – March 23, 1983) was an American dentist from Des Moines, Washington, who became the first human to live with a permanent artificial heart, the Jarvik-7. Clark lived for 112 days with the Jarvik-7, which was implanted into him on December 2, 1982, at the University of Utah Medical Center, before dying of multiple organ system failure.

== Life before implant ==
Clark was born on January 21, 1921, in Provo, Utah, to parents Moroni Jensen Clark and Ethel Bailey Clark. He was raised as a member of The Church of Jesus Christ of Latter-day Saints, but drifted away from the religion in the 1940s and was inactive in it for much of his life, returning to the faith late in life. After graduating from Provo High School in 1939, Clark joined the Utah National Guard, which was federalized during World War II. He then served as a bombardier in the United States Army Air Forces.

In 1944, Clark married Una Loy Mason, who he had known since the seventh grade. The couple had three children. After the war, Clark attended Brigham Young University and attained a pre-med bachelor's degree in zoology in 1948, but he was rejected from the University of Utah School of Medicine. He then moved to Seattle, Washington and became a dentist in 1950, working for Dr. Homer Lockett and later opening his own practice. Clark retired in 1977.

== Artificial heart recipient ==
A monument to Clark at Memorial Park in Provo.

By 1980, Clark was suffering from cardiomyopathy with an unknown cause. Conventional medical treatment, including a trial of the new drug amrinone, failed to stop his cardiac decomposition. At age 61, he was too old to qualify for a heart transplant, the maximum age for which was then 50.

In 1982, he visited the research laboratories at the University of Utah, where a team led by Dr. William DeVries had successfully implanted artificial hearts into lab animals. Due in part to the efforts of Dale Lott, DeVries' team had recently received the approval of the Food and Drug Administration to implant the Jarvik-7 artificial heart into a human patient who would otherwise imminently die from deterioration of the heart muscle. Clark was one of approximately 10 patients examined by the school's Artificial Heart Patient Evaluation Committee, consisting of DeVries, two cardiologists, a psychiatrist, a nurse, and a social worker, and was the first to receive their unanimous approval for the implant. Clark met the committee's strict psychological standards and was deemed capable of handling the strain and lifestyle limitations of living with an artificial heart, needed since a suicidal patient could easily cut open the pneumatic hoses powering the heart.

On November 29, 1982, Clark signed the initial consent form for the operation. He was then required to sign the form again 24 hours later after reflecting on the decision. Medical ethicist George Annas later criticized the consent form, which was 11 pages long, as "incomplete, internally inconsistent, and confusing", and based on the incorrect assumption "that Clark would either die on the operating table or return home in about ten days". No mechanism to terminate the experiment, or to allow Clark to die a dignified death if need be, was provided for.

The implant operation was publicly announced (though Clark was not identified by name) on November 30, and it was scheduled to begin at 8:00 a.m. MST on December 2. In the days leading up to the operation, Clark's heartbeat became irregular. On December 1, his condition rapidly declined, and at 8 p.m. DeVries and his team decided to begin the operation as quickly as possible. The operation began at 11:27 p.m., with a cardiopulmonary bypass installed to maintain blood flow in the meantime. Clark's heart was removed at 12:07 a.m. December 2, and the installation of the Jarvik-7 began at 12:50. The bypass was removed at 4:09, leaving Clark entirely reliant on the Jarvik-7, and the seven-hour operation ended at 6:35 a.m. DeVries, known for listening to rock music while performing surgery, chose Joseph-Maurice Ravel's "Boléro" for Clark's operation.

Clark recovered well at first, and on December 4, his condition was upgraded from "critical" to "serious but stable". However, that evening he developed pneumothorax in his lungs, which doctors said was unrelated to the implant, and underwent a second surgery to repair the ruptured air sacs. Shortly thereafter, he began to experience kidney failure, for which he was promptly treated. His condition improved steadily, but became critical again after suffering a series of seizures at about 5:45 a.m. December 7, which were blamed on the kidney treatment causing a chemical imbalance in his brain.

At 9:45 a.m. December 14, Clark's blood pressure suddenly dropped. An hour later, DeVries and his team began another operation, which determined that the Jarvik-7's mitral valve had ruptured, causing blood to flow back into the wrong chamber. Half of the artificial heart was replaced during the successful four-hour surgery.

On December 18, Clark was well enough to be moved from his hospital bed to a chair, and his condition was upgraded again from critical to serious. On December 22, he announced, "I want to get up", then walked from his bed to the chair with limited assistance. As he steadily recovered, it was hoped that he could leave the hospital by the end of January 1983, moving into a specially-prepared apartment nearby. However, the anticoagulants Clark needed to prevent clots from forming around the Jarvik-7 caused nosebleeds beginning on January 9. On January 18, he underwent another operation lasting two and a half hours to stop the nasal bleeding, which was successful. At times, he suffered from "ICU psychosis" and could not remember why he was in the hospital.

On February 14, Clark's condition was upgraded from "serious" to "fair", and he was moved out of the intensive care unit for the first time since the implant, moving into a private room within the hospital. However, while the artificial heart functioned perfectly, his lungs and kidneys remained too weak to support him, and he returned to the ICU the following day to be placed back on a respirator. He was released from the ICU on February 24 and returned to the private room.

Clark began vomiting on the morning of March 3, and some of his vomit entered the lungs, causing him to contract aspiration pneumonia. The infection lasted weeks and ravaged his already weakened lungs, forcing him to be placed back on a respirator on March 16. It was accompanied by an intermittent fever. Starting on March 20, his kidney function began to deteriorate.

On the morning of March 23, despite the ongoing kidney failure, doctors said his condition was still "fair" and that they would not return him to the ICU. Around noon that day, his blood flow dropped dramatically and doctors considered an operation to check the status of the artificial heart, but normal blood flow resumed on its own about 30 minutes later. In the early evening, Clark's condition began to deteriorate rapidly. All of his natural organs failed, and no neurological function could be detected. At 10:02 p.m., doctors turned off the Jarvik-7, which had continued pumping blood through Clark's body throughout the decline and was not considered a factor in his death. Clark was then declared dead.
