= Artificial heart =

Mechanical device which replaces the heart

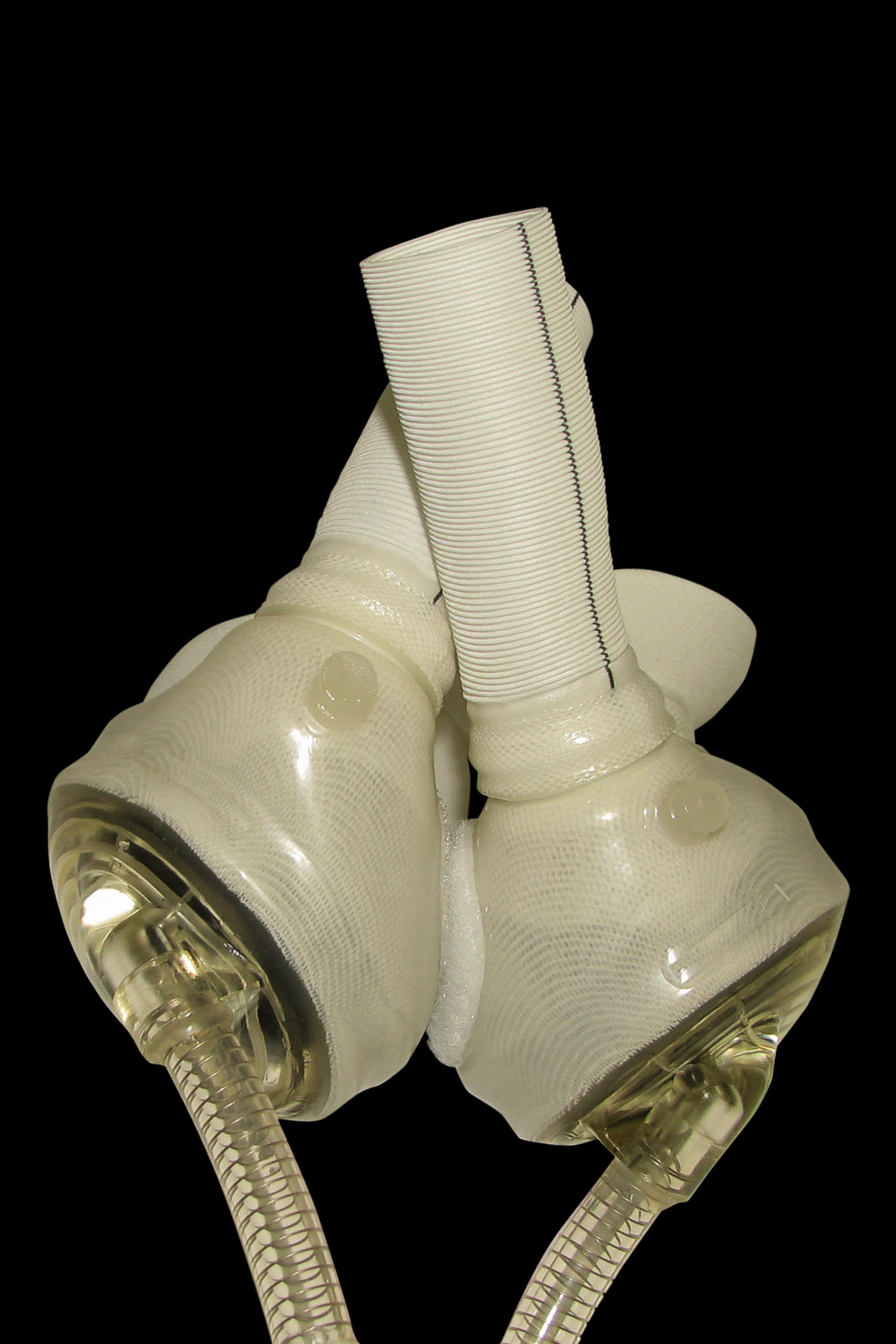
- The CardioWest (now SynCardia) Temporary Total Artificial Heart

An artificial heart is a device that replaces the heart. Currently, artificial hearts are typically used as a temporary bridge to heart transplantation, but ongoing research aims to develop a device that could one day permanently replace the heart. As of December 2023, there are two commercially available full artificial heart devices; both are intended for temporary use (less than a year) for patients with total heart failure who are awaiting a human heart transplant.

Although other similar inventions preceded it from the late 1940s, the first artificial heart to be successfully implanted in a human was the Jarvik-7 in 1982, designed by a team including Willem Johan Kolff, William DeVries and Robert Jarvik.

An artificial heart is distinct from a ventricular assist device (VAD; for either one or both of the ventricles, the heart's lower chambers), which may also be a permanent solution, or the intra-aortic balloon pump – both devices are designed to support a failing heart. It is also distinct from a cardiopulmonary bypass machine, which is an external device used to provide the functions of both the heart and lungs, used only for a few hours at a time, most commonly during cardiac surgery. It is also distinct from a ventilator, used to support failing lungs, or the extracorporeal membrane oxygenation (ECMO), which is used to support those with both inadequate heart and lung function for up to days or weeks, unlike the bypass machine.

== History ==
=== Origins ===
A synthetic replacement for the heart has long been a major goal of modern medicine. A functional artificial heart could reduce the need for heart transplantation, as the demand for donor organs exceeds supply.

Although the heart is conceptually a pump, it embodies subtleties that defy straightforward emulation with synthetic materials and power supplies. Artificial hearts have historically had issues from both a biomedical standpoint, regarding clotting and foreign object rejection, as well as longevity and practicality, regarding the lifespan of the device as well as the equipment required to run it.

Since the inception of the device, artificial hearts have been continually improved as medical technology has. More recent devices, such as the Carmat heart, have sought to improve upon their predecessors by reducing complications resultant from device implant, such as foreign-body rejection and thrombus.

=== Early development ===
The first artificial heart was made by the Soviet scientist Vladimir Demikhov in 1938. It was implanted in a dog.

On 2 July 1952, 41-year-old Henry Opitek, suffering from shortness of breath, made medical history at Harper University Hospital at Wayne State University in Michigan. The Dodrill-GMR heart machine, considered to be the first operational mechanical heart, was successfully used while performing heart surgery. Ongoing research was done on calves at Hershey Medical Center, Animal Research Facility, in Hershey, Pennsylvania, during the 1970s.

Forest Dewey Dodrill, working closely with Matthew Dudley, used the machine in 1952 to bypass Henry Opitek's left ventricle for 50 minutes while he opened the patient's left atrium and worked to repair the mitral valve. In Dodrill's post-operative report, he notes, "To our knowledge, this is the first instance of survival of a patient when a mechanical heart mechanism was used to take over the complete body function of maintaining the blood supply of the body while the heart was open and operated on."

A heart–lung machine was first used in 1953 during a successful open heart surgery. John Heysham Gibbon, the inventor of the machine, performed the operation and developed the heart–lung substitute himself.

Following these advances, scientific interest for the development of a solution for heart disease developed in numerous research groups worldwide.

=== Early designs of total artificial hearts ===
In 1949, a precursor to the modern artificial heart pump was built by doctors William Sewell and William Glenn of the Yale School of Medicine using an Erector Set, assorted odds and ends, and dime-store toys. The external pump successfully bypassed the heart of a dog for more than an hour.

On 12 December 1957, Willem Johan Kolff, the world's most prolific inventor of artificial organs, implanted an artificial heart into a dog at Cleveland Clinic. The dog lived for 90 minutes.

In 1958, Domingo Liotta initiated the studies of TAH (Total Artificial Heart) replacement at Lyon, France, and in 1959–60 at the National University of Córdoba, Argentina. He presented his work at the meeting of the American Society for Artificial Internal Organs held in Atlantic City in March 1961. At that meeting, Liotta described the implantation of three types of orthotopic (inside the pericardial sac) TAHs in dogs, each of which used a different source of external energy: an implantable electric motor, an implantable rotating pump with an external electric motor, and a pneumatic pump.

Paul Winchell designed a model of artificial heart with the assistance of Henry Heimlich (the inventor of the Heimlich maneuver) and submitted a patent for a mechanically driven artificial heart implementing a cam driven roller mechanism to compress flexible bags containing blood, on 6 February 1961. This is contrary to the popular claim that Winchell submitted the patent in the summer of 1956, as well as contrary to the claim that Winchell "invented" the artificial heart. In fact, two patents existed prior to Winchell's submission. These patents were filed 10 April 1956, and 17 April 1959, respectively. Winchell also claims that the design within his patent was used in later models of the Jarvik hearts, a claim in which Robert Jarvik, the principle designer of those hearts, denies on the basis that his pneumatically driven hearts share little in common with Winchell's mechanically actuated patent.

In 1964, the National Institutes of Health started the Artificial Heart Program, with the goal of putting an artificial heart into a human by the end of the decade. The purpose of the program was to develop an implantable artificial heart, including the power source, to replace a failing heart.

In February 1966, Adrian Kantrowitz rose to international prominence when he performed the world's first permanent implantation of a partial mechanical heart (left ventricular assist device) at Maimonides Medical Center.

In 1967, Kolff left Cleveland Clinic to start the Division of Artificial Organs at the University of Utah and pursue his work on the artificial heart.

1. In 1973, a calf named Tony survived for 30 days on an early Kolff heart.
2. In 1975, a bull named Burk survived 90 days on the artificial heart.
3. In 1976, a calf named Abebe lived for 184 days on the Jarvik 5 artificial heart.
4. In 1981, a calf named Alfred Lord Tennyson lived for 268 days on the Jarvik 5.

Over the years, more than 200 physicians, engineers, students and faculty developed, tested and improved Kolff's artificial heart. To help manage his many endeavors, Kolff assigned project managers. Each project was named after its manager. Graduate student Robert Jarvik was the project manager for the artificial heart projects, from which the Jarvik line of artificial hearts get their name. There, physician-engineer Clifford Kwan-Gett invented two components of an integrated pneumatic artificial heart system: a ventricle with hemispherical diaphragms that did not crush red blood cells (a problem with previous artificial hearts) and an external heart driver that inherently regulated blood flow without needing complex control systems. Jarvik also combined several modifications: an ovoid shape to fit inside the human chest, a more blood-compatible polyurethane developed by biomedical engineer Donald Lyman, and a fabrication method by Kwan-Gett that made the inside of the ventricles smooth and seamless to reduce dangerous stroke-causing blood clots.

=== First clinical implantation of a total artificial heart ===
On 4 April 1969, Domingo Liotta and Denton A. Cooley replaced a dying man's heart with a mechanical heart inside the chest at The Texas Heart Institute in Houston as a bridge for a transplant. The man woke up and began to recover. After 64 hours, the pneumatic-powered artificial heart was removed and replaced by a donor heart. However thirty-two hours after transplantation, the man died of what was later proved to be an acute pulmonary infection, extended to both lungs, caused by fungi, most likely caused by an immunosuppressive drug complication.

The original prototype of Liotta-Cooley artificial heart used in this historic operation is prominently displayed in the Smithsonian Institution's National Museum of American History "Treasures of American History" exhibit in Washington, D.C.

=== First clinical applications of a permanent pneumatic total artificial heart ===
The first clinical use of an artificial heart designed for permanent implantation rather than a bridge to transplant occurred in 1982 at the University of Utah.

In 1981, William DeVries submitted a request to the FDA for permission to implant the Jarvik-7 into a human being. On 1 December 1982, William DeVries implanted the Jarvik-7 artificial heart into Barney Clark, a retired dentist from Seattle who had severe congestive heart failure. Clark's case was highly publicized and received much media attention, garnering attention from television networks, newspapers and periodicals. Clark lived for 112 days tethered to the UtahDrive pneumatic drive console, a device weighing some 400 pounds (180 kg). During that time Clark required several re-operations, suffered seizures, experienced prolonged periods of confusion and a number of instances of bleeding and asked several times to be allowed to die. Clark, however, still believed his being part of the initial experiment was an important contribution to medicine, and maintained an overall positive outlook on his condition. Clark died on 23 March 1983, of multiorgan system failure. Despite the complications, DeVries considered Clark's case a success.

DeVries subsequently moved his practice to Humana Hospital Audubon in Louisville, Kentucky to continue studies using the Jarvik-7. DeVries' first artificial heart patient in Louisville was Bill Schroeder. DeVries replaced Schroeder's failing heart with a Jarvik-7 on 25 November 1984. Like Clark, Schroeder suffered from bleeding that required re-operation to resolve. In the first weeks the outlook was good and Schroeder was allowed to have a can of Coors beer and he was given a phone call by President Reagan, in which he famously asked the president for an update on a late Social Security check. However, 19 days after the operation, Schroeder suffered the first of four strokes. Despite this, his recovery continued and was allowed to live in a specially outfitted apartment near the hospital for a period of time, as well as use a newly developed battery-powered portable drive unit for the heart which allowed him to venture out of the hospital for short periods. Schroeder's health continued to decline as three more strokes plagued his time with the artificial heart. He died on 6 August 1986, from complications from a stroke, respiratory failure and sepsis, after 620 days with the artificial heart.

Three more patients received the Jarvik-7 as a permanent heart. Murray Haydon, DeVries' third patient, received a Jarvik-7 on 17 February 1985. Haydon suffered pulmonary issues and was required to be on a mechanical ventilator for the duration of his time with the artificial heart. Haydon died of infection and kidney failure on 19 June 1986, after 488 days with his artificial heart. On 7 April 1985, Dr. Bjarne Semb of Karolinska Hospital in Stockholm, Sweden implanted a Jarvik-7 in Swedish businessman Leif Stenberg. Stenberg lived 229 largely uneventful days with the heart, but suffered from a stroke and subsequently died on 21 November 1985. Jack Burcham was DeVries' fourth and final patient to receive a Jarvik-7 as a destination therapy. Burcham received his heart on 14 April 1985, but due to complications from the size of the device, bleeding and kidney failure, Burcham died just 10 days later on 25 April 1985.

In the mid-1980s, artificial hearts were powered by large pneumatic drive consoles. Moreover, two sizable catheters had to cross the body wall to carry the pneumatic pulses to the implanted heart, greatly increasing the risk of infection. To speed development of a new generation of technologies, the National Heart, Lung, and Blood Institute opened a competition for implantable electrically powered artificial hearts. Three groups received funding: Cleveland Clinic in Cleveland, Ohio; the College of Medicine of Pennsylvania State University (Penn State Milton S. Hershey Medical Center) in Hershey, Pennsylvania; and AbioMed, Inc. of Danvers, Massachusetts. Despite considerable progress, the Cleveland program was discontinued after the first five years.

=== First clinical application of an intrathoracic pump ===
On 19 July 1963, E. Stanley Crawford and Domingo Liotta implanted the first clinical Left Ventricular Assist Device (LVAD) at The Methodist Hospital in Houston, Texas, in a patient who had a cardiac arrest after surgery. The patient survived for four days under mechanical support but did not recover from the complications of the cardiac arrest; finally, the pump was discontinued, and the patient died.

=== First clinical application of a paracorporeal pump ===
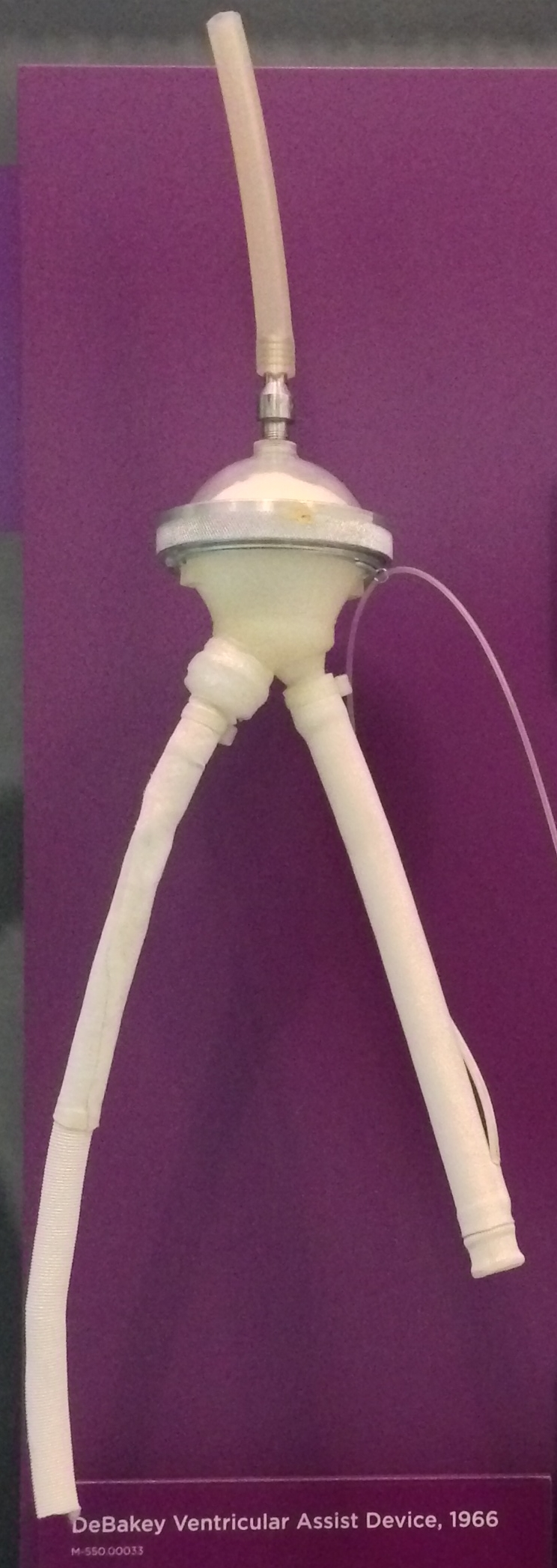
1966 DeBakey ventricular assist device.

On 21 April 1966, Michael DeBakey and Liotta implanted the first clinical LVAD in a paracorporeal position (where the external pump rests at the side of the patient) at The Methodist Hospital in Houston, in a patient experiencing cardiogenic shock after heart surgery. The patient developed neurological and pulmonary complications and died after few days of LVAD mechanical support. In October 1966, DeBakey and Liotta implanted the paracorporeal Liotta-DeBakey LVAD in a new patient who recovered well and was discharged from the hospital after 10 days of mechanical support, thus constituting the first successful use of an LVAD for postcardiotomy shock.

=== First VAD patient with FDA approved hospital discharge ===
In 1990, Brian Williams was discharged from the University of Pittsburgh Medical Center (UPMC), becoming the first VAD patient to be discharged with Food and Drug Administration (FDA) approval. The patient was supported in part by bioengineers from the University of Pittsburgh's McGowan Institute.

== Total artificial hearts ==
=== Approved medical devices ===
==== SynCardia ====
SynCardia Systems is a company based in Tucson, Arizona, which currently has two separate models of their artificial heart available. It is available in a 70cc and 50cc size. The 70cc model is used for biventricular heart failure in adult men, while the 50cc is for children and women. As of 2014, more than 1,250 patients have received SynCardia artificial hearts.

The device has two drive systems available for patients to use; the Companion 2 in-hospital driver, approved by the FDA in 2012, or the Freedom Driver System, approved in 2014. The Companion 2 replaced the Circulatory Support System Console, which was the original drive system for the heart. The Freedom Driver System is a compact portable driver for greater mobility and can allow some patients to return home. To power the heart, the drivers send pulsed air through the drivelines into the heart. The drivers also monitor blood flow for each ventricle.

In 1991 the rights to the Jarvik-7 were transferred to CardioWest, who resumed testing of the heart. Following good results with the TAH as a bridge to heart transplant, a trial of the CardioWest TAH was initiated in 1993 and completed in 2002. After the completion of this trial, CardioWest became SynCardia. The SynCardia total artificial heart was first approved for use in 2004 by the US Food and Drug Administration.

Though the SynCardia shares its design with the Jarvik-7, improvements have been made throughout its lifespan, reducing the occurrence of stroke and bleeding. Lifespan while being supported by the device has also drastically improved, with one patient being supported by the device for over 7 years (2,555 days).

In 2016, SynCardia filed for bankruptcy protection and was later acquired by the private equity firm Versa Capital Management. In 2021, SynCardia was acquired by Hunniwell Lake Ventures under its portfolio company, Picard Medical. In April 2023, SynCardia filed to become a publicly traded company via SPAC.

==== Carmat Aeson bioprosthetic heart ====
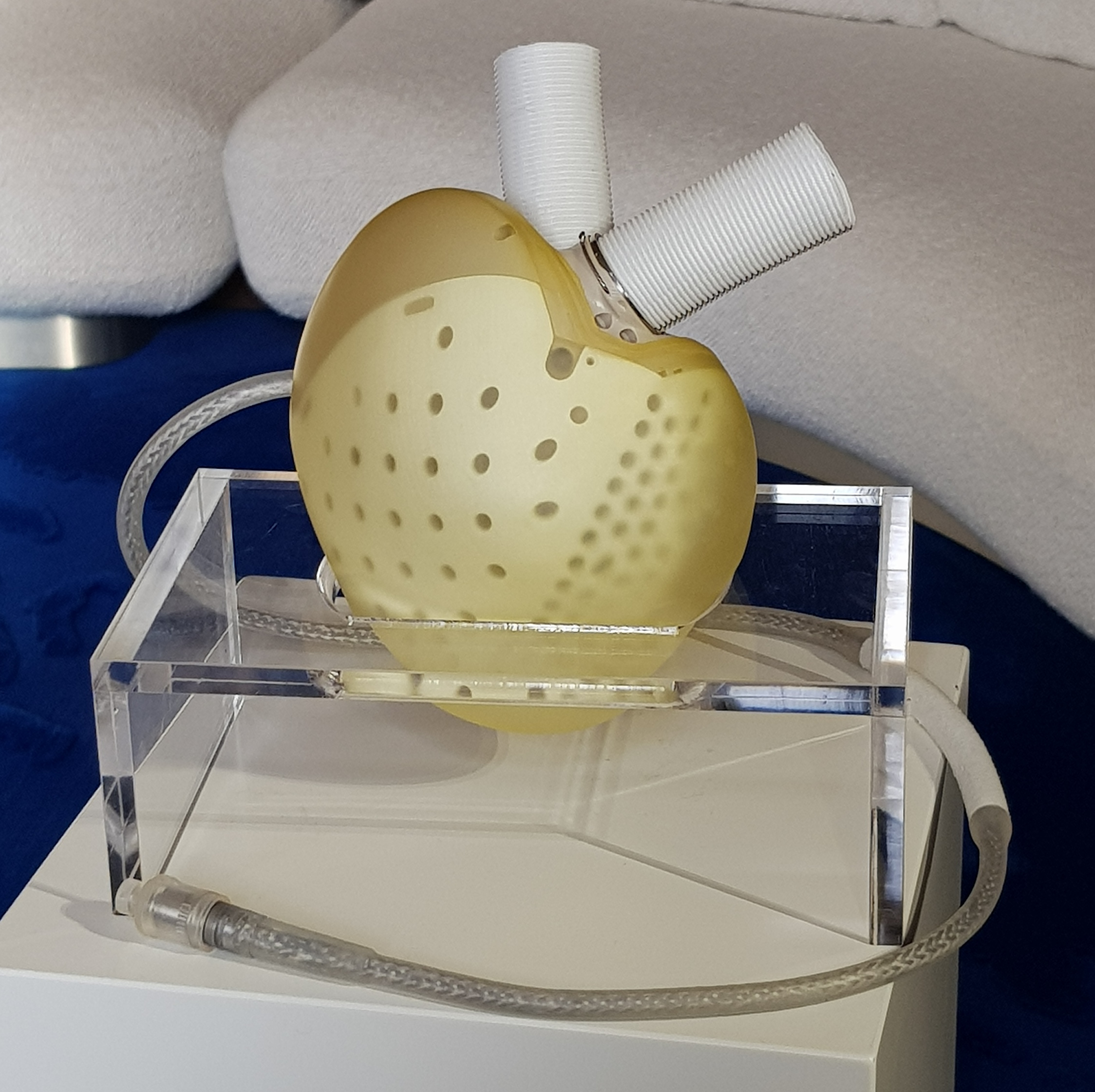
Carmat's artificial heart.

On 27 October 2008, French professor and leading heart transplant specialist Alain F. Carpentier announced a timeline that a fully implantable artificial heart would be ready for clinical trial by 2011 and for alternative transplant in 2013. It was developed and would be manufactured by his biomedical firm CARMAT SA, and venture capital firm Truffle Capital. The prototype used embedded electronic sensors and was made from chemically treated animal tissues, called "biomaterials", or a "pseudo-skin" of biosynthetic, microporous materials.

According to a press-release by Carmat dated 20 December 2013, the first implantation of its artificial heart in a 75-year-old patient was performed on 18 December 2013, by the Georges Pompidou European Hospital team in Paris (France). The patient died 75 days after the operation.

In Carmat's design, called the Aeson, two chambers are each divided by a membrane that holds hydraulic fluid on one side. A motorized pump moves hydraulic fluid in and out of the chambers. The pumped fluid causes the membrane to move, causing blood to pump through the heart. The blood-facing side of the membrane is made of tissue obtained from a sac that surrounds a cow's heart, to make the device more biocompatible. The Carmat device also uses valves made from cow heart tissue and has sensors to detect increased pressure within the device. Cardiac information is sent to an internal control system that can adjust the flow rate in response to increased demand, such as when a patient is exercising.

The Carmat Aeson is aimed to be used in cases of terminal heart failure, instead of being used as a bridge device while the patient awaits a transplant. At 900 grams it weighs nearly three times the typical heart and is targeted primarily towards obese men. It also requires the patient to carry around an additional Li-Ion battery. The projected lifetime of the artificial heart is around 5 years (230 million beats).

In 2016, trials for the Carmat "fully artificial heart" were banned by the National Agency for Security and Medicine in Europe after short survival rates were confirmed. The ban was lifted in May 2017. At that time, a European report stated that Celyad's C-Cure cell therapy for ischemic heart failure "Could only help a subpopulation of Phase III study participants, and Carmat will hope that its artificial heart will be able to treat a higher proportion of heart failure patients".

The Carmat artificial heart was approved for sale in the European Union, receiving a CE marking on 22 December 2020. As of December 2023, the Carmat is only available in Europe as a bridge-to-transplant, for up to 180 days while awaiting a human heart transplant. In the United States it is only available in clinical trials.

In June 2025 Carmat filed for insolvency and was liquidated in January 2026.

=== Historical prototypes and devices ===
==== Total artificial heart pump ====
The U.S. Army artificial heart pump was a compact, air-powered unit developed by Kenneth Woodward at Harry Diamond Laboratories in the early to mid-1960s. The Army's heart pump was partially made of plexiglass, and consisted of two valves, a chamber, and a suction flapper. The pump operated without any moving parts under the principle of fluid amplification – providing a pulsating air pressure source resembling a heartbeat.

==== Jarvik Hearts ====
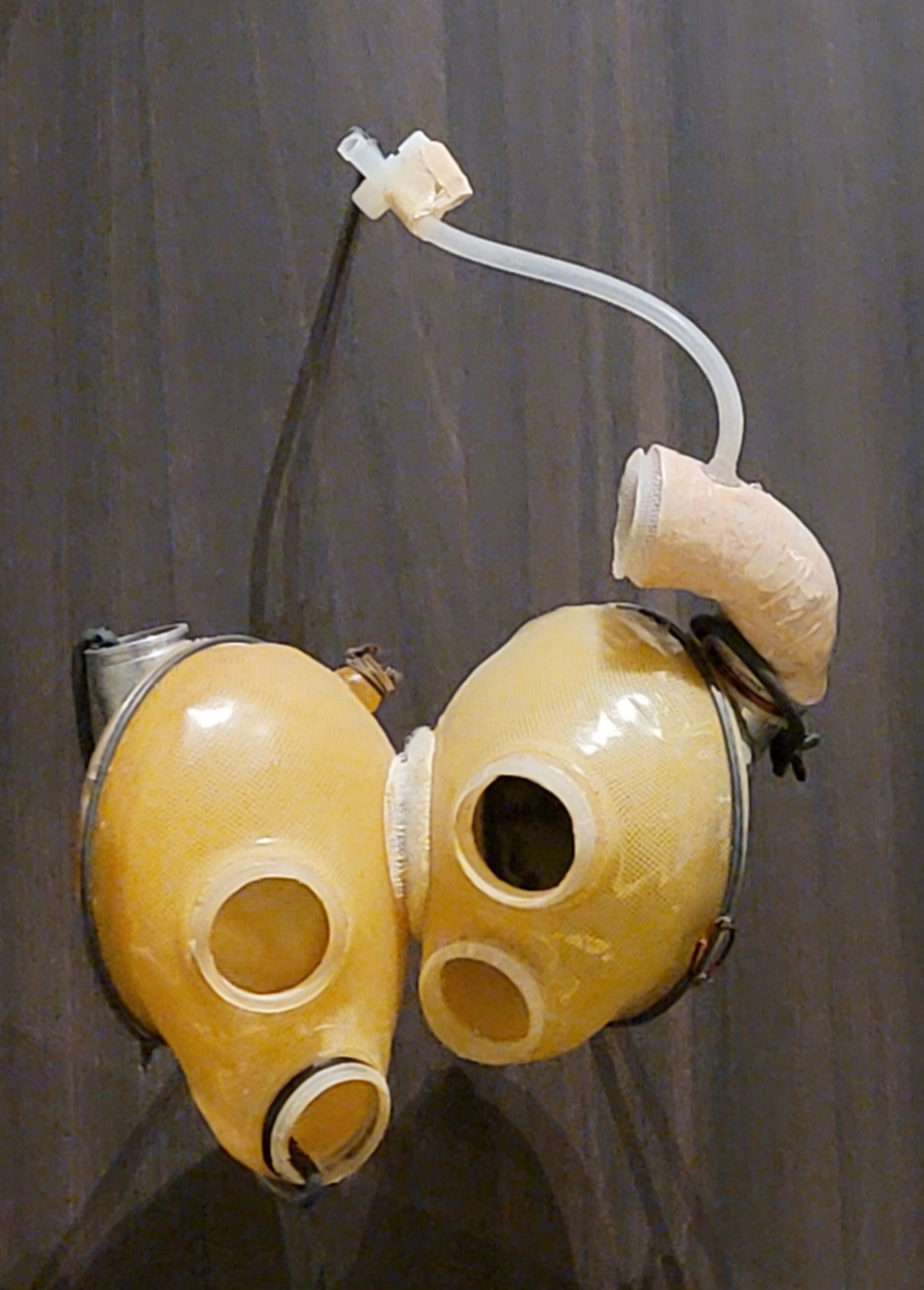
Jarvik-7 Artificial Heart Prototype without Valves

The Jarvik line of hearts was developed by the now-defunct medical device company Symbion, by medical device researchers Willem Kolff and Robert Jarvik in conjunction with the University of Utah. These hearts were developed through animal trials and culminated in the Jarvik-7 100, the original model that was used in the first clinical trials of the heart. Jarvik-7 hearts were made primarily of biocompatible plastics and polymers. These hearts used four Medtronic-Hall valves and consisted of two "ventricles" which contained multi-layer low-stress diaphragms. The Jarvik-7 was powered pneumatically by two transcutaneous drivelines attached to a large compressed-air drive console, originally called the Utahdrive. The drive console contained two independent drive systems for redundancy, data recording devices and backup compressed air cylinders.

The Jarvik-7 was later developed in a smaller 70cc variant so that it would fit better in the chest cavities of more patients. Another development that came to the Jarvik-7 was the introduction of a battery-powered portable drive system the size of a briefcase that later patients took advantage of.

Contrary to popular belief and erroneous articles in several periodicals, the Jarvik-7 heart was not permanently banned for use. After a hostile takeover, Symbion's facilities had lost FDA compliance in 1990 and required that the devices be destroyed. After the rights to the device had been transferred to then CardioWest Technologies, an investigational study was approved in 1993. CardioWest Technologies became SynCardia in 2003 who currently produces the modern version of the Jarvik-7, known as the SynCardia temporary Total Artificial Heart.

==== POLVAD ====
Since 1991, the Foundation for Cardiac Surgery Development (FRK) in Zabrze, Poland, has been developing artificial heart systems. The Polish heart support system POLCAS includes the artificial ventricle POLVAD-MEV and the control units POLPDU-401, POLPDU-402, and POLPDU-501. These devices are designed for single-patient use. The POLPDU-401 and POLPDU-402 control units are typically limited to hospital settings due to their size, control mechanisms, and power requirements.The control unit of 501 series is the latest product of FRK. Due to its much smaller size and weight, it is significantly more mobile solution. For this reason, it can be also used during supervised treatment conducted outside the hospital.

==== Phoenix-7 ====
In June 1996, a 46-year-old man received a total artificial heart implantation done by Jeng Wei at Cheng-Hsin General Hospital in Taiwan. This technologically advanced pneumatic Phoenix-7 Total Artificial Heart was manufactured by Taiwanese dentist Kelvin K. Cheng, Chinese physician T. M. Kao, and colleagues at the Taiwan TAH Research Center in Tainan, Taiwan. With this experimental artificial heart, the patient's BP was maintained at 90–100/40–50 mmHg and cardiac output at 4.2–5.8 L/min. The patient then received the world's first successful combined heart and kidney transplantation after bridging with a total artificial heart.

==== AbioMed hearts ====
The first AbioCor to be surgically implanted in a patient was on 3 July 2001. The AbioCor is made of titanium and plastic with a weight of 0.9 kg (two pounds), and its internal battery can be recharged with a transduction device that sends power through the skin. The internal battery lasts for half an hour, and a wearable external battery pack lasts for four hours. The FDA announced on 5 September 2006, that the AbioCor could be implanted for humanitarian uses after the device had been tested on 15 patients. It is intended for critically ill patients who cannot receive a heart transplant. Some limitations of the current AbioCor are that its size makes it suitable for less than 50% of the female population and only about 50% of the male population, and its useful life is only 1–2 years.

By combining its valved ventricles with the control technology and roller screw developed at Penn State, AbioMed designed a smaller, more stable heart, the AbioCor II. This pump, which should be implantable in most men and 50% of women with a life span of up to five years, had animal trials in 2005, and the company hoped to get FDA approval for human use in 2008. After a great deal of experimentation, AbioMed has abandoned development of total artificial hearts as of 2015. Abiomed as of 2019 only markets heart pumps, "intended to help pump blood in patients who need short-term support (up to 6 days)", which are not total artificial hearts.

==== Frazier-Cohn ====
On 12 March 2011, an experimental artificial heart was implanted in 55-year-old Craig Lewis at The Texas Heart Institute in Houston by O. H. Frazier and William Cohn. The device was a combination of two modified HeartMate II pumps which had undergone bovine trials.

So far, only one person has benefited from Frazier and Cohn's artificial heart. Craig Lewis had amyloidosis in 2011 and sought treatment. After obtaining permission from his family, Frazier and Cohn replaced his heart with their device. Lewis survived for another 5 weeks after the operation; he eventually died from liver and kidney failure due to his amyloidosis, after which his family asked that his artificial heart be unplugged.

=== Current prototypes ===
==== Soft Total Artificial Heart ====
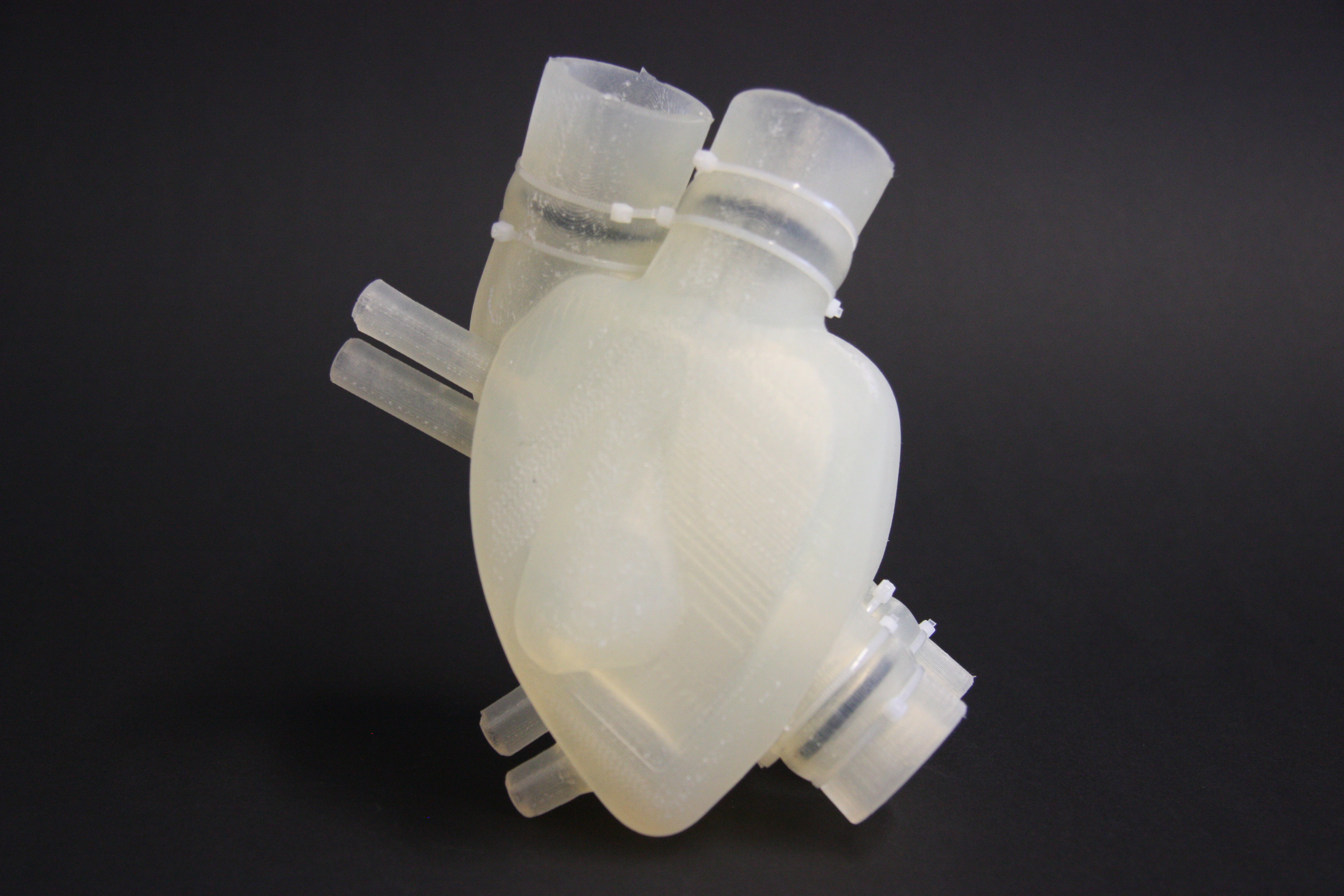
Soft Total Artificial Heart, developed in the functional material laboratory at ETH Zürich

On 10 July 2017, Nicholas Cohrs and colleagues presented a new concept of a soft total artificial heart in the Journal of Artificial Organs. The heart was developed in the Functionals Materials Laboratory at ETH Zurich.

The soft total artificial heart (sTAH) is a silicone monoblock fabricated with the help of 3D bioprinting technology. It weighs 390g, has a volume of 679 cm^{3,} and is operated through pressurized air. The stated goal of their sTAH is to "develop an artificial heart that is roughly the same size as the patient's own one and which imitates the human heart as closely as possible in form and function". The sTAH fundamentally moves and works like a natural heart, but the prototype only performed for 3000 beats (about 30 to 50 minutes at an average heart rate) in a hybrid mock circulation machine before the silicone membrane (2.3 mm thick) between the Left Ventricle and the Air Expansion Chamber ruptured.

The working life of a more recent prototype, using various polymers instead of silicone, was still limited, according to reports in early 2018, with that model providing a useful life of 1 million heartbeats, roughly ten days in a human body. At the time, Cohrs and his team were experimenting with CAD software and 3D printing, striving to develop a model that would last up to 15 years, though Cohrs noted a timeline on the process was hard to predict.

==== BiVACOR Artificial Heart ====
Founded in 2008, the BiVACOR company has been developing a total artificial heart based on a rotary centrifugal pump. Artificial heart researchers and cardiologists O. H. Frazier and William Cohn are on the board of the BiVACOR company. The BiVACOR heart seeks to improve the artificial heart by using a magnetically levitated impeller which reduces clotting and only has a single moving part. This also reduces size and complexity, as well as only requiring a battery pack to run. The BiVACOR heart is not pulsatile like previous hearts and contains no valves, but is capable of generating "beats" by rapidly changing the speed of the impeller. BiVACOR has been tested as a replacement for a heart in a sheep.

On 10 November 2023, the BiVACOR heart received FDA authorization under the investigational device exemption for use in human trials. In July 2024, a successful implantation of the BiVACOR artificial heart in a 57-year-old man with end-stage heart failure was conducted as part of its first-in-human clinical study at Baylor St. Luke's Medical Center, with four more patients expected to be enrolled in the study. A few weeks later, the second person, a 34-year-old man, had a BiVACOR artificial heart implanted at Duke University Hospital as a successful bridge to a heart transplant 10 days later. In December 2024, BiVACOR received FDA authorization to expand its early feasibility study to 15 patients following 5 total successful transplantations of its artificial heart.

In March 2025, St Vincents Hospital in Sydney announced a successful bridge to heart transplant using the BiVACOR artificial heart that lasted over 3 months. The patient, an unidentified Australian man in his forties, became the first to be discharged from the hospital with the BiVACOR artificial heart still implanted.

== Others ==
A centrifugal pump or an axial-flow pump can be used as an artificial heart, resulting in the patient being alive without a pulse.

A centrifugal artificial heart which alternately pumps the pulmonary circulation and the systemic circulation, causing a pulse, has been described.

Researchers have constructed a heart out of foam. The heart is made out of flexible silicone and works with an external pump to push air and fluids through the heart. It currently cannot be implanted into humans, but offers a new concept in artificial hearts.

=== Hybrid assistive devices ===
Patients who have some remaining heart function but who can no longer live normally may be candidates for ventricular assist devices (VAD), which do not replace the human heart but complement it by taking up much of the function.

The first Left Ventricular Assist Device (LVAD) system was created by Domingo Liotta at Baylor College of Medicine in Houston in 1962.

Another VAD, the Kantrowitz CardioVad, designed by Adrian Kantrowitz, boosts the native heart by taking up over 50% of its function. Additionally, the VAD can help patients on the wait list for a heart transplant. In a young person, this device could delay the need for a transplant by 10–15 years, or even allow the heart to recover, in which case the VAD can be removed. A Left Ventricular Assist Device (LVAD) is one of the advanced artificial heart pump that is implanted in patients with end-stage heart failure. It helps the weakened left ventricle pump blood efficiently to the body.

The first heart assist device was approved by the FDA in 1994, and two more received approval in 1998. While the original assist devices emulated the pulsating heart, newer versions, such as the Heartmate II, developed by The Texas Heart Institute of Houston, provides continuous flow. These pumps (which may be centrifugal or axial flow) are smaller and potentially more durable and last longer than the current generation of total heart replacement pumps. Another major advantage of a VAD is that the patient keeps the natural heart, which may still function for temporary back-up support if the mechanical pump were to stop. This may provide enough support to keep the patient alive until a solution to the problem is implemented.

In August 2006, an artificial heart was implanted into a 15-year-old girl at the Stollery Children's Hospital in Edmonton, Alberta. It was intended to act as a temporary fixture until a donor heart could be found. Instead, the artificial heart (called a Berlin Heart) allowed for natural processes to occur and her heart healed on its own. After 146 days, the Berlin Heart was removed, and the girl's heart functioned properly on its own. On 16 December 2011 the Berlin Heart gained U.S. FDA approval. The device has since been successfully implanted in several children including a 4-year-old Honduran girl at Children's Hospital Boston.

Several continuous-flow ventricular assist devices have been approved for use in the European Union, and, as of August 2007, were undergoing clinical trials for FDA approval.

In 2012, Craig Lewis, a 55-year-old Texan, presented at the Texas Heart Institute with a severe case of cardiac amyloidosis. He was given an experimental continuous-flow artificial heart transplant which saved his life. Lewis died 5 weeks later of liver failure after slipping into a coma due to the amyloidosis.

In 2012, a study published in the New England Journal of Medicine compared the Berlin Heart to extracorporeal membrane oxygenation (ECMO) and concluded that "a ventricular assist device available in several sizes for use in children as a bridge to heart transplantation [such as the Berlin Heart] was associated with a significantly higher rate of survival as compared with ECMO." The study's primary author, Charles D. Fraser Jr., surgeon in chief at Texas Children's Hospital, explained: "With the Berlin Heart, we have a more effective therapy to offer patients earlier in the management of their heart failure. When we sit with parents, we have real data to offer so they can make an informed decision. This is a giant step forward."

Suffering from end-stage heart failure, former Vice President Dick Cheney underwent a procedure at INOVA Fairfax Hospital, in Fairfax Virginia in July 2010, to have a Heartmate II VAD implanted. In 2012, he received a heart transplant at age 71 after 20 months on a waiting list.

== See also ==
- Organ culture
- Artificial heart valve
- Artificial cardiac pacemaker
- Ventricular assist device
