= Black segregation and the LDS Church =

History of black segregation by LDS Church

Black segregation in the Church of Jesus Christ of Latter-day Saints was a part of the religion for over a century. The LDS church discouraged social interaction or marriage with Black people and encouraged racial segregation. The practice began with church founder Joseph Smith who stated, "I would confine them [Black people] by strict law to their own species". Until 1963, many church leaders supported legalized racial segregation. David O. McKay, J. Reuben Clark, Henry D. Moyle, Ezra Taft Benson, Joseph Fielding Smith, Harold B. Lee, and Mark E. Peterson were leading proponents of segregation. In the late 1940s First Presidency members publicly and privately condemned white-Black marriage calling it "repugnant", "forbidden", and a "wicked virus".

== Segregation in LDS congregations ==
During the years, different Black families were either told by church leadership not to attend church or chose not to attend church after white members complained. The church began considering segregated congregations, and sent missionaries to southern United States to establish segregated congregations.

In 1947, mission president, Rulon Howells, decided to segregate the branch in Piracicaba, Brazil, with white members meeting in the chapel and Black members meeting in a member's home. When the Black members resisted, arguing that integration would help everyone, Howells decided to remove the missionaries from the Black members and stop visiting them. The First Presidency under Heber J. Grant sent a letter to stake president Ezra Taft Benson in Washington, D.C., advising that if two Black women were "discreetly approached" they should be happy to sit at the back or side so as not to upset some white women who had complained about sitting near them in the Relief Society church meetings. At least one Black family was forbidden from attending church after white members complained about their attendance. In 1956, Mark E. Petersen suggested that a segregated chapel should be created for places where a number of Black families joined.

== Segregation in church facilities ==
The church also advocated for segregation laws and enforced segregation in its facilities. Hotel Utah, a church-run hotel, banned Black guests, even when other hotels made exceptions for Black celebrities. Black people were prohibited from performing in the Salt Lake Tabernacle, and the Deseret News did not allow Black individuals to appear in photographs with white people. Church leaders urged white members to join civic groups and opened up LDS chapels "for meetings to prevent Negroes from becoming neighbors", even after a 1948 Supreme Court decision against racial covenants in housing. They counseled members to buy homes so black people would not move next to LDS chapels. In the 1950s, the San Francisco mission office took legal action to prevent Black families from moving into the church neighborhood. A Black man living in Salt Lake City, Daily Oliver, described how, as a boy in the 1910s, he was excluded from an LDS-led boy scout troop because they did not want Black people in their building. In 1954, apostle Mark E. Petersen taught that segregation was inspired by God, arguing that "what God hath separated, let not man bring together again". He used church teachings on the curse of Cain, the Lamanites and Nephites, Jacob and Esau, and the Israelites and Canaanites as scripture-based precedence for segregation.

== Segregation in blood supplies ==
Church leaders advocated for the segregation of donated blood, concerned that giving white members blood from Black donors might disqualify them from the priesthood. In 1943, the LDS Hospital opened a blood bank which kept separate blood stocks for white and Black people. It was the second-largest in-hospital blood bank. After the 1978 ending of the priesthood ban, Consolidated Blood Services agreed to supply hospitals with connections to the LDS Church, including LDS Hospital, Primary Children's and Cottonwood Hospitals in Salt Lake City, McKay-Dee Hospital in Ogden, and Utah Valley Hospital in Provo. Racially segregated blood stocks reportedly ended in the 1970s, although white patients worried about receiving blood from a Black donor were reassured that this would not happen even after 1978.

== Segregation in public schools ==
Church leaders opposed desegregation in public schools. After Dr. Robinson wrote an editorial in the Deseret News, President McKay deleted portions that indicated support for desegregation in schools, stating it would not be fair to force a white child to learn with a Black child. Decades earlier as a missionary he had written that he did "not care much for a negro". Apostle J. Rueben Clark instructed the Relief Society general president to keep the National Council of Women from supporting going on record in favor of school desegregation.

== Segregation at Brigham Young University ==
Church leaders supported segregation at Brigham Young University (BYU). Apostle Harold B. Lee protested an African student who was given a scholarship, believing it was dangerous to allow Black students on BYU's campus. In 1960 the NAACP reported that the predominantly LDS landlords of Provo, Utah would not rent to a BYU Black student, and that no motel or hotel there would lodge hired Black performers. Later that year BYU administrators hired a Black man as a professor without the knowledge of its president Ernest Wilkinson. When Wilkinson found out he wrote that it was a "serious mistake of judgement", and "the danger in doing so is that students ... assume that there is nothing improper about mingling with other races", and the man was promptly reassigned to a departmental advisory position to minimize the risk of mingling.

A few months later, BYU leaders were "very much concerned" when a male Black student received a large number of votes for student vice president. Subsequently, Lee told Wilkinson he would hold him responsible if one of his granddaughters ever went to "BYU and bec[a]me engaged to a colored boy". Later the BYU Board of Trustees decided in February 1961 to officially encourage Black students to attend other universities for the first time.

In 1965, administrators began sending a rejection letter to Black applicants which cited the LDS Church's discouragement of interracial courtship and marriage as the motive behind the decision. By 1968, there was only one African American student on campus, though, Wilkinson wrote that year when responding to criticism that "all Negroes who apply for admission and can meet the academic standards are admitted." BYU's dean of athletics Milton Hartvigsen called the Western Athletic Conference's 1969 criticism of BYU's ban on Black athletes bigotry towards a religious group, and the next month Wilkinson accused Stanford University of bigotry for refusing to schedule athletic events with BYU over its discrimination towards black athletes.

In 1976, an African American, Robert Lee Stevenson was elected a student body vice president at BYU. In 2002, BYU elected its first African American student body president. In June 2020, BYU formed a committee on race and inequality.

== See also ==
- Black people and Mormonism
- Mormonism and slavery
- Racial segregation of churches in the United States
- Proslavery
