= Dan Liljenquist =

American politician

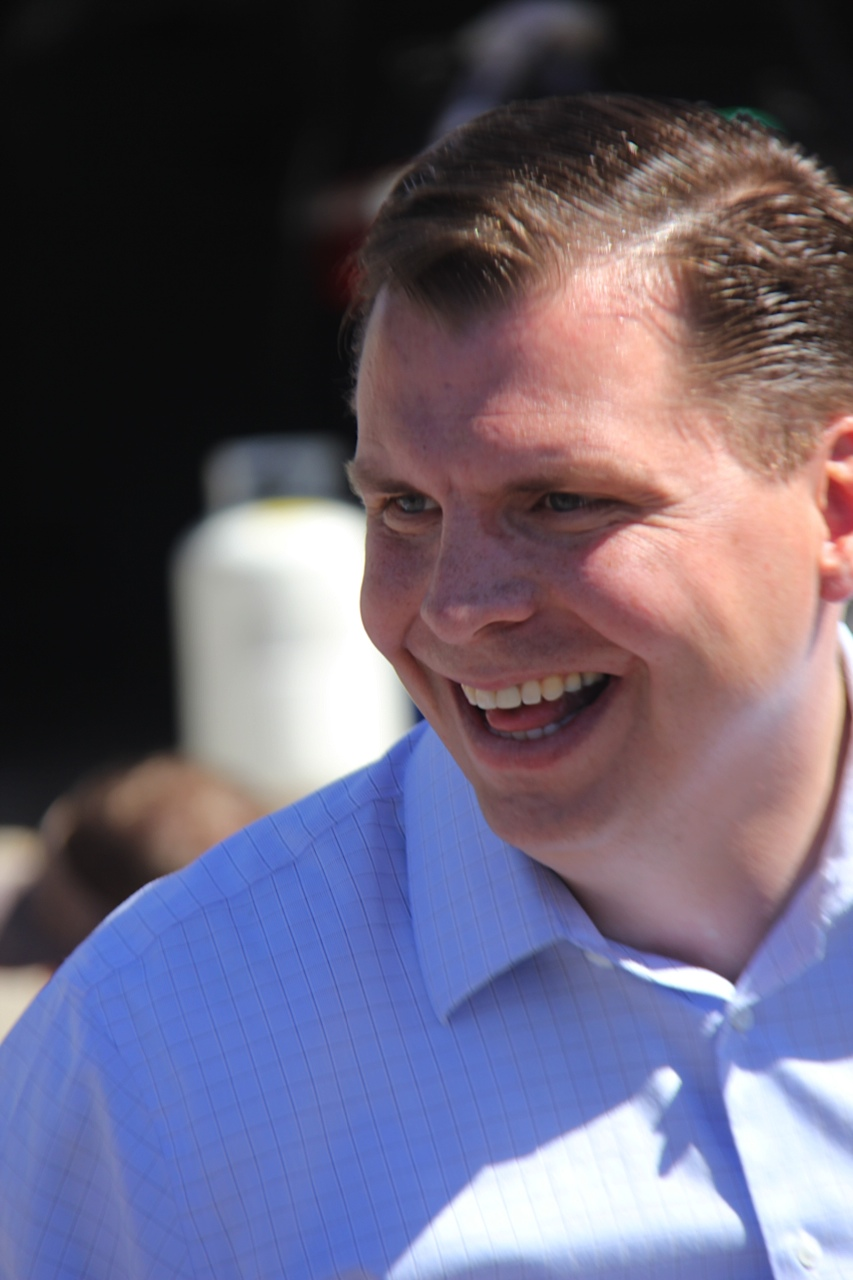

Member of the Utah Senate from the 23rd district
- In office 2009–2011
- Preceded by: Dan Eastman
- Succeeded by: Todd Weiler

Personal details
- Born: Daniel Redford Liljenquist; July 10, 1974 (age 52) Nashville, Tennessee, U.S.
- Spouse: Brooke Davies
- Children: 6
- Education: Brigham Young University (BA); University of Chicago (JD)
- Occupation: Executive Vice President and Chief Strategy Officer at Intermountain Health

Daniel Redford Liljenquist is an American healthcare executive and former member of the Utah State Senate.

== Early life and education ==
Daniel Liljenquist was born in Nashville, Tennessee, to John E. Liljenquist and Colleen Redford Liljenquist while his father was teaching at Vanderbilt University. His family moved to Idaho Falls, Idaho, when he was five years old.

Liljenquist graduated from Skyline High School before attending Brigham Young University, where he earned a Bachelor of Arts degree in economics in 1998. He went on to study at the University of Chicago Law School, receiving a J.D. degree in 2001.

== Career ==
After graduating from the University of Chicago Law School, Liljenquist joined Bain & Company as a consultant in 2001. He worked in the firm's Dallas office until 2003.

In 2005, Liljenquist became president and chief operating officer of FOCUS Services. He sold his interests in the company in 2011 and founded Liljenquist Strategies in 2012, a consulting firm specializing in public sector pensions and benefits reform. That same year, he began contributing a weekly column to the Deseret News.

=== Intermountain Health ===
Liljenquist joined Intermountain Healthcare in 2012 as director of special projects within the Shared Accountability organization, focusing on population health. In 2017, he was appointed vice president of the Enterprise Initiative Office. He later became chief strategy officer, overseeing strategy, corporate development, government relations, consumer experience, strategic partnerships, and digital technology services.

=== Civica Rx, CivicaScript, and Graphite Health ===
In addition to his work at Intermountain Healthcare, Liljenquist has been involved in several healthcare initiatives aimed at expanding access, affordability, and transparency. He played a leading role in establishing CivicaScript, an affiliated organization dedicated to retail generic medications.

Liljenquist serves as chairman of the board for Civica Rx and CivicaScript. He is also a board member of the Civica Foundation, the Equable Institute, and CenterPoint Legacy Theatre. He previously served as a board member of the Lucy Burns Institute and as board chair of Graphite Health.

== Political career ==
=== Utah State Senate ===
In November 2008, Liljenquist was elected to the Utah State Senate from the 23rd district, receiving 70 percent of the vote.

During his tenure, he served on the Appropriations, Standing, and Interim Committees. He sponsored SB 126, which prioritized performance over seniority in public employee rehiring decisions, and SB 63, which restructured Utah's pension system by moving new hires to a defined contribution plan capped at ten percent.

Liljenquist was criticized in 2011 by Freedom Path and others for missing 24 percent of Senate votes.

Following a 22 percent decline in the pension fund's value during the 2008 financial crisis, which resulted in a 30 percent funding gap, Liljenquist introduced reforms affecting employees hired after July 1, 2011. He also sponsored SB 43, which ended "double-dipping" and eliminated pensions for state legislators.

In 2011, he sponsored SB 180, Utah's Medicaid reform bill, which passed unanimously. The legislation capped Medicaid spending growth to the rate of the general fund, transitioned the program from fee-for-service to managed care, and made Utah the first state to cap Medicaid growth on a per-member basis. The reforms were projected to save $2.5 billion over seven years.

Liljenquist resigned from the Utah State Senate in December 2011.

=== 2012 United States Senate campaign ===
After resigning from the state Senate, Liljenquist announced his candidacy for the United States Senate in January 2012. He challenged incumbent Orrin Hatch and was one of ten Republican candidates in the race. At the state convention, he received 40.81 percent of the delegate vote, forcing Hatch into his first primary election since 1976. Hatch went on to win both the primary and the general election.

== Awards and recognition ==
In 2021 and 2022, Modern Healthcare named Liljenquist among the "100 Most Influential People in Healthcare." The publication also recognized him as one of its "Top 25 Innovators" and included him in "The Collaborative: 45 Healthcare Leaders Who Exemplify Collaboration Created in Service to the Patient" in 2021.

In 2011, Governing magazine named him "Public Official of the Year." That same year, FreedomWorks named him its "National Legislative Entrepreneur of the Year," and State Budget Solutions recognized him as "National Legislator of the Year." The Utah Technology Council presented him with a similar honor in 2010. The Utah Taxpayers Association named him "Taxpayer Advocate of the Year" in both 2010 and 2011.

On June 22, 2025, the Healthcare Financial Management Association (HFMA) presented Liljenquist with the Richard L. Clarke Board of Directors Award.

== Personal life ==
Liljenquist and his wife, Brooke, have six children and live in Utah.

In June 2008, Liljenquist was injured in the Aéreo Ruta Maya crash in Guatemala. He had been traveling with CHOICE Humanitarian when the plane crashed in a field following an engine failure. Eleven of the fourteen people on board were killed. Liljenquist survived, but sustained multiple fractures to his right leg and left ankle.
