= Gunnison Valley =

Gunnison Valley may refer to:

== Officially named landforms ==
- Gunnison Valley (Sanpete and Sevier counties, Utah), an unpopulated valley in central Utah, United States, that is located primarily in southeastern Sanpete County, but extends south into northeastern Sevier County; the valley also spans between the Fishlake and Manti-La Sal national forests
- Gunnison Valley (Emery and Grand counties, Utah), a populated basin in eastern Utah, United States, that is located in eastern Emery County and western Sevier County, just south of the Book Cliffs; the basin is bisected by the Green River that flows into the Colorado River

== Unofficially named areas ==
- Gunnison Valley, an area in Colorado, United States, that is related to the city of Gunnison and the Gunnison River; examples of this use include the Gunnison Valley Health Hospital, Gunnison Valley School, Gunnison Valley Technologies, all of which are located in Gunnison, Colorado
- Gunnison Valley, an area in Utah, United States, that is related to the city of Gunnison and the Gunnison Reservoir; examples of this use include the Gunnison Valley High School, the Gunnison Valley Hospital, and the Gunnison Valley Gazette, all of which are located in Gunnison, Utah
