= St. George Regional Hospital =

Hospital in St. George, Utah, United States

- Intermountain Healthcare

Geography
- Location: St. George, Utah, United States
- Coordinates: 37°06′00″N 113°33′13″W

Organization
- Care system: Private

Services
- Emergency department: Level II Trauma Center
- Beds: 284

Links
- Website: Official website
- Lists: Hospitals in Utah

Intermountain St. George Regional Hospital (formerly Dixie Regional Medical Center (DRMC)) is a 284-bed hospital located on two campuses in St. George, Utah, United States. St. George Regional is the major medical referral center for northwestern Arizona, southeastern Nevada and southern Utah. St. George Regional is fully accredited by the Joint Commission on Accreditation of Healthcare Organizations and is a service of Intermountain Healthcare, a nonprofit health care system serving the Intermountain West. It is also a Level II Trauma Center.

== History ==
The history of hospitals in Washington County began in 1913 when, with the support of the community, Dr. Donald A. McGregor opened the Washington County Hospital. The hospital was set up in what was formerly the Morris Hotel and had seven beds. In 1917, the name of the hospital was changed to the McGregor Hospital in honor of its original physician. It was operated by the McGregor family until its closure in 1952.

In 1952 the county residents provided support again for a new facility to replace the McGregor Hospital. On August 6 the new Dixie Pioneer Memorial Hospital opened for service. This hospital was also owned and operated by Washington County. By the 1970s this facility had 41 beds. The former Dixie Pioneer Memorial Hospital, which was built on the west half of the current 400 East campus, was eventually torn down to make way for later expansion of medical facilities.

After twenty more years of growth within the region, the county residents once again approved funding for additional medical facilities. In May 1972 a bond was approved for the new Dixie Medical Center, with actual construction beginning in 1975. The new facility had 65 beds and was built on the campus of the former Dixie Pioneer Memorial Hospital. It officially opened on January 1, 1976.

In 1975, The Church of Jesus Christ of Latter-day Saints divested itself of its hospitals and turned over ownership and operation to a newly formed nonprofit organization. This new organization, Intermountain Healthcare (but then known as Intermountain Health Care [IHC]) assumed the operations of fifteen hospitals. However, the nearest of these hospitals was the Garfield Memorial Hospital, over 100 miles (160 km) away in Panguitch, Utah (the rest were in Northern Utah, Southeastern Idaho, and Southwestern Wyoming). In the months that followed the opening of the new Dixie Medical Center, Washington County arranged for the sale of its new hospital to IHC for $2.65 million (equivalent to $15,000,000 in 2025). The deal, which was finalized in August 1976, was the first hospital facility to be purchased by IHC.

Less than a decade later further expansion of the facility was necessary, so another $12.2 million (equivalent to $39,400,000 in 2025) was completed on the medical center in 1983. In 2003 IHC changed the name to Dixie Regional Medical Center. Two years later, IHC changed its own name to Intermountain Healthcare (or just Intermountain, for short). Rapid population growth in the region necessitated additional facilities, but since there was little additional room on the current campus an entirely new facility was built on a 61 acres (25 ha) site about ten blocks east (on the east side of I-15). Construction began in 2001 on the new facility at a cost of $100 million (equivalent to $182,000,000 in 2025). It opened for service on November 24, 2003, but did not entirely replace the old facility. Jointly the two facilities had a 245-bed capacity. Life Flight (Intermountain's air ambulance service) began operating from the new facility on January 14, 2014.

When controversy arose over the name "Dixie" in 2020, Intermountain Health Care announced the name would change to its current name, Intermountain St. George Regional Hospital on January 1, 2021. Intermountain believed it was affecting the recruitment of doctors, nurses, and other staff that did not understand local use of the term "Dixie." The organization also stated that internally they had been advised for some time that "its facilities adopt a consistent naming pattern — one that includes the city name and the specific use of the word 'hospital.'"

== River Road Campus ==
The Intermountain St. George Regional Hospital main campus is located at 1380 East Medical Center Drive and is often referred to as the River Road Campus of the hospital (as it is located just east of River Road). The state-of-the-art 420,000-square-foot (39,000 m^{2})+ facility hosts 132 acute inpatient beds and the community's emergency department. Healthcare in southern Utah advanced to a new level as the first tertiary service, open-heart surgery, was performed on 2 December 2003. The hospital has since been named a Top 50 Cardiovascular Hospital by Truven Health Analytics.

== 400 East Campus ==
The original Dixie Regional Medical Center facility, which is located at 544 South 400 East, was still used for additional services and is often referred to as the 400 East Campus of the hospital. Southern Utah's first Acute Rehabilitation Center, which providing specialty care for stroke and other neurologically impaired patients, opened on the newly remodeled 5th Floor, December 26, 2003. The Newborn Intensive Care Unit (NICU) opened in May 2005. Women's and children's care, the smallest fully accredited cancer center in the nation, same-day surgery, wound clinic, lab, some imaging services, IV therapy, the diabetes clinic, hyperbaric medicine clinic and behavioral medicine were located at this campus. All in-patient hospital beds and services have moved to the river road location as of 2019. The 400E campus now only houses child care, a clinic, and several offices.
