= Mountain View Hospital =

Mountain View Hospital can be one of the following:

- Mountain View Hospital (Gadsden, Alabama)
- Mountain View Hospital (Idaho Falls, Idaho)
- Mountain View Hospital, Las Vegas Nevada
- Mountain View Hospital (Las Cruces, New Mexico)
- Mountain View Hospital in Madras, Oregon, now St. Charles Medical Center - Madras
- Mountain View Hospital (Payson, Utah)
- Mountain View Hospital (New Zealand)
