= Lane Beattie =

American businessman and politician

Member of the Utah Senate from the 23rd district
- In office 1989–2000
- Preceded by: Jack Bangerter
- Succeeded by: Dan Eastman

Personal details
- Born: September 29, 1951 (age 74)
- Party: Republican
- Spouse: Joy Hadlow
- Children: 3
- Education: University of Utah

Lane Beattie is an American businessman and politician from the state of Utah.

Beattie served in the Utah Senate from 1989 through 2000, representing the 23rd Utah Senate District. He served as Senate Majority Leader from 1993 through 1994 and Senate President from 1995. He opted not to seek reelection in 2000. Beattie helped plan the 2002 Winter Olympics, held in Salt Lake City, and consulted with the committee planning the 2010 Winter Olympics, held in Vancouver, Canada. Beattie is the president and chief executive officer of the Salt Lake Chamber of Commerce, and he was named to the board of directors of the United States Chamber of Commerce in 2011.

Beattie was a potential candidate in the 2016 election for the United States Senate seat held by Mike Lee.
