= Karen Carroll (pathologist) =

American infectious disease pathologist and medical microbiologist

- Born: Karen Colleen Carroll; Maryland, U.S.
- Education: Notre Dame of Maryland University; University of Maryland School of Medicine
- Spouse: Bruce C. Marshall
- Children: 2
- Scientific career
- Fields: Clinical microbiology, infectious disease pathology
- Workplaces: Johns Hopkins School of Medicine

Karen Colleen Carroll is an American infectious disease pathologist and medical microbiologist specialized in the evaluation of diagnostic platforms and the epidemiology of healthcare-associated infections. She is a professor of pathology and director of the division of medical microbiology at the Johns Hopkins School of Medicine.

== Life ==
Carroll was born and raised in a suburb of Baltimore in a Roman Catholic family. Her mother worked in the home and her father was a laborer who had served in the U.S. Navy during World War II. Neither of her parents finished high school. Her father died from a chronic illness when Carroll was 13. She attended an all girls Catholic high school. Carroll had an early interest in science. In 1970, she won a four-year scholarship to attend Notre Dame of Maryland University. She graduated in 1975 with a bachelor's degree in biology. Carroll earned a M.D. at the University of Maryland School of Medicine. She completed an internal medicine residency at the University of Rochester Medical Center. Carroll conducted an infectious disease fellowship at the University of Massachusetts Chan Medical School.

From 1986 to 1988, Carroll and her husband, pulmonologist Bruce C. Marshall, moved to Memphis, Tennessee. Carroll began a private community hospital infectious disease practice in the Memphis area. During this time, she served as director of infection control and she helped draft HIV policy. By 1989, she had two sons and Carroll and Marshall moved to Utah. She conducted a fellowship in medical microbiology at the Veteran Affairs Salt Lake City Health Care through the department of pathology at the University of Utah. She worked under Larry Reimer. During this one-year fellowship, she also worked in the Utah Public Health Laboratory and at the Primary Children's Hospital where she was mentored by Judy A. Daly, the director of its microbiology laboratories.

Carroll research focuses on the evaluation of diagnostic platforms and the epidemiology of healthcare-associated infections including Methicillin-resistant Staphylococcus aureus and Clostridioides difficile infection. She is a professor of pathology at the Johns Hopkins School of Medicine and director of the division of medical microbiology since 2002. She is a fellow of the American Society for Microbiology, College of American Pathologists, and the Infectious Diseases Society of America.
