= Bangerter =

Bangerter is a surname. Notable people with the surname include:

- Fabienne Bangerter, Swiss association football player
- Friedrich Bangerter (1868–19??), Swiss-American inventor
- Hans Bangerter (1924–2022), Swiss UEFA official
- Jack Bangerter (1925–2008), American politician
- Liz Bangerter (born 1974), American politician
- Michael Bangerter (1936–2016), actor in A Bridge Too Far
- Norman H. Bangerter (1933–2015), American politician
- William Grant Bangerter (1918–2010), American Mormon missionary

It could also refer to Bangerter Highway (UT-154), a state highway in Utah named after Norman Bangerter.
