= Wilson W. Sorensen =

College president

Wilson Woodruff Sorensen (August 8, 1916 – July 30, 2009) was the president of Utah Technical College (now Utah Valley University, or UVU) from 1946 to 1982. He played a large role in building up and paving the way for the expansion of the school.

== Biography ==
Sorensen was born in Draper, Utah, and was raised in Draper and Deseret, Utah. He graduated from Jordan High School in Sandy, Utah. As a young man and member of the Church of Jesus Christ of Latter-day Saints (LDS Church), he served as a missionary in the California Mission. Later in life he would continue activity in the LDS Church, serving as a bishop and in a stake presidency. He married Helen Howard in 1942 in the Salt Lake Temple. They had four children and raised their family in Provo, Utah. Helen died in 2000 and their daughter Kathy died in 2001.

Sorensen graduated from Brigham Young University (BYU) in Provo, Utah, with a bachelor's degree in industrial arts and a master's in educational administration.

=== Career ===
After graduation, Sorensen taught industrial arts at Granite High School in South Salt Lake, Utah. He was hired by the Central Utah Vocational School to purchase supplies to train workers in arms and ammunition manufacturing during World War II. Although he had an educational background, Sorensen was a carpenter by trade, which made him attractive to head the growing trade school as it became a state-funded institution.

When Sorensen started at the institution, it had under 1,000 students. By the time he left, there were over 5,500 students and it had moved campuses twice, arriving at its current location in Orem, Utah, under the name Utah Technical College. Sorensen was succeeded as president of the school by J. Marvin Higbee in 1982. In his long retirement, Sorensen saw the school grow into Utah Valley Community College, then Utah Valley State College (UVSC), then Utah Valley University.

=== Retirement ===
Sorensen remained active during retirement. He was on the Committee to Save Geneva Steel in the 1980s, and he ran for a seat in the Utah State Legislature in 1984. He published a history of Utah Technical College in 1985. He also served on the board of the Orem Community Hospital and served as chairman of Provo's Freedom Festival. Sorensen has been named Citizen of the Year by the Kiwanis Club of Provo and received the Modern Day Pioneer award from the Sons of Utah Pioneers.

Late in life, he moved to South Jordan, Utah. He died of natural causes shortly before his 93rd birthday.

== Relationship to UVU ==
UVU leadership recognizes Sorensen for building up the school and paving the way for its future expansion. The student activities center at UVU is named for Sorensen, as well as the school's benefactor's society and Lifetime Achievement Award. At UVSC's first alumni recognition banquet in 1998, Sorensen became the award's inaugural recipient.

Observing the academic transformation of the college into a university, Sorensen openly pushed for it to retain its focus on vocational training. He opposed the closing of the school's machine tools, heavy equipment, and welding programs, saying, "Eventually, the liberal arts will take over." He believed the "best education" was "to first get job preparation" and "[learn] how to make a living", followed by "classes that will enrich you." He argued that the need for academic research was satisfied by existing universities in Utah, which had "enough universities already". He felt UVSC's new university status "will give the school a social image. That's all it will do." Sorensen had hoped for the school to develop into something more like the Dunwoody College of Technology or the Rochester Institute of Technology.

The school's representatives responded that modern students needed academic degrees and that vocational programs had either closed due to poor enrollment or had evolved with industry. It also stated that the need for local vocational training was filled by the Utah College of Applied Technology. Other former UVSC presidents also disagreed with Sorensen and welcomed university status.

== Publications ==
- Sorensen, Wilson W. (1985). A Miracle in Utah Valley: The Story of Utah Technical College, 1941–1982. Provo: Utah Technical College.
