= The Orthopedic Specialty Hospital =

- Intermountain Healthcare

- TOSH's campus in Murray, Utah

- Shown in Utah, United States

Geography
- Location: 5848 South Fashion Boulevard, Murray, Utah, United States
- Coordinates: 40.644048°N 111.883177°W

Organization
- Care system: Private
- Type: Specialist
- Affiliated university: None
- Patron: None
- Network: None

Services
- Beds: 36
- Speciality: Orthopedic

History
- Founded: 1991

Links
- Website: The Orthopedic Specialty Hospital
- Lists: Hospitals in Utah

The Orthopedic Specialty Hospital (TOSH) was founded in 1991 and is a 100,000-square-foot (9,300 m^{2}) facility located in Murray, Utah, United States, at the former Intermountain Healthcare Cottonwood Hospital location. It includes 36 clinical patient rooms, ten surgery suites, a human performance research laboratory, a 25-meter lap pool, a full weight and exercise room, and a rehabilitation center.

== Description ==
TOSH specialize in sports medicine, sports biomechanics, physical therapy, occupational therapy, athletic training, nutrition, biomechanical engineering, exercise and sports physiology. It is one of the country's premier facilities for orthopedic care. TOSH is the official sports medicine provider for the U.S. Ski and Snowboard teams, the U.S. Speedskating team, and was recently designated an official training site for Olympic athletes. TOSH has its own inpatient facility and the physicians at TOSH perform major surgery, including total knee, shoulder and hip replacements. Many of the cutting-edge techniques and devices used at TOSH were developed there, and are now used worldwide.

== History ==
In 2007, TOSH and USANA Health Sciences formed an informal research partnership. In 2009 this partnership was formalized, and the two entities began formal research collaboration.

In 2009, TOSH customized one of its performance labs for soccer players. High-speed cameras analyze movements of players kicking soccer balls and give feedback on movements and feet positioning. Specially designed glasses with built-in strobe lights train eyes what is often overlooked with a fast-moving ball. A Nike visual training system, one of only 20 in the country, is also used to strengthen peripheral vision.

In July 2010, TOSH and USANA Health Sciences announced the launch of two new vitamin studies. The first study is to determine whether Vitamin D can reduce post-exercise muscular weakness in young, physically active people. The second study involves patients at TOSH with anterior cruciate ligament (ACL) injuries to find a complementary therapeutic approach for improving muscular strength in post-surgical patients utilizing both Vitamin C and Vitamin E. These studies are part of a research partnership between the two entities that began in 2007 and was formalized in 2009. USANA provided the pharmaceutical-grade supplements for both of the studies, as well as provided partial funding to the ACL study.

In 2010, TOSH opened their Back & Neck Center which was designed to rapidly assess back and neck pain, including any necessary diagnostic imaging services. Major problems are diagnosed at this center and then patients are passed onto specialists near their residence.

== See also ==
- Intermountain Medical Center
