= LRH =

LRH may refer to:

- L. Ron Hubbard, founder of Scientology
- La Rochelle - Île de Ré Airport, France, IATA code
- LRH-1, a protein that in humans is encoded by the NR5A2 gene.
- Lord Royal Highness, a character in SpongeBob SquarePants
- Luke Robert Hemmings
- Logan Regional Hospital, a hospital in Logan, Utah
