= List of hospitals in Utah =

This is a list of hospitals in Utah (U.S. state).

Name	City	Owner	Beds
Alta View Hospital	Sandy	Intermountain Healthcare	50
American Fork Hospital	American Fork	Intermountain Healthcare	90
Ashley Regional Medical Center	Vernal	LifePoint Hospitals	39
Bear River Valley Hospital	Tremonton	Intermountain Healthcare	16
Beaver Valley Hospital	Beaver	City of Beaver	25
Blue Mountain Hospital	Blanding	Blue Mountain Hospital, Inc.	11
Brigham City Community Hospital	Brigham City	MountainStar Healthcare	40
Cache Valley Hospital	North Logan	MountainStar Healthcare	28
Castleview Hospital	Price	LifePoint Hospitals	39
Cedar City Hospital	Cedar City	Intermountain Healthcare	48
Central Valley Medical Center	Nephi	Juab County	25
Davis Hospital and Medical Center	Layton	Steward Health Care System	220
Delta Community Medical Center	Delta	Intermountain Healthcare	18
Encompass Health Rehabilitation Hospital	Sandy	Encompass Health	84
Fillmore Community Medical Center	Fillmore	Intermountain Healthcare	18
Garfield Memorial Hospital	Panguitch	Garfield County (operated by Intermountain Healthcare)	41
Gunnison Valley Hospital	Gunnison	Independent	24
Heber Valley Medical Center	Heber	Intermountain Healthcare	19
Huntsman Cancer Institute	Salt Lake City	University of Utah	660
Huntsman Mental Health Institute	Salt Lake City	University of Utah	173
Intermountain Medical Center	Murray	Intermountain Healthcare	504
Jordan Valley Medical Center	West Jordan	Steward Health Care System	133
Jordan Valley Medical Center West Valley Campus	West Valley City	Steward Health Care System	
Kane County Human Resource SSD (Hospital) (aka Kane County Hospital)	Kanab	Special Service District of the State of Utah	25
Lakeview Hospital	Bountiful	MountainStar Healthcare	89
Layton Hospital	Layton	Intermountain Healthcare	43
LDS Hospital	Salt Lake City	Intermountain Healthcare	262
Logan Regional Hospital	Logan	Intermountain Healthcare	146
Lone Peak Hospital	Draper	MountainStar Healthcare	30
McKay-Dee Hospital Center	Ogden	Intermountain Healthcare	310
Moab Regional Hospital	Moab	Independent	17
Mountain Point Medical Center	Lehi	Steward Health Care System	40
Mountain View Hospital	Payson	MountainStar Healthcare	124
Mountain West Medical Center	Tooele		36
Ogden Regional Medical Center	Ogden	MountainStar Healthcare	239
Orem Community Hospital	Orem	Intermountain Healthcare	22
The Orthopedic Specialty Hospital (TOSH)	Murray	Intermountain Healthcare	40
Park City Hospital	Park City	Intermountain Healthcare	37
Primary Children's Hospital	Salt Lake City	Intermountain Healthcare	289
Riverton Hospital	Riverton	Intermountain Healthcare	88
St. George Regional Hospital	St. George	Intermountain Healthcare	284
St. Mark's Hospital	Millcreek	MountainStar Healthcare	263
Salt Lake Behavioral Health Hospital	South Salt Lake	Universal Health Services	118
Salt Lake Regional Medical Center	Salt Lake City	Steward Health Care System	143
San Juan Hospital	Monticello	Independent	25
Sanpete Valley Hospital	Mt. Pleasant	Intermountain Healthcare	18
Sevier Valley Hospital	Richfield	Intermountain Healthcare	24
Shriners Hospitals for Children	Salt Lake City	Shriners Hospitals for Children	40
Spanish Fork Hospital	Spanish Fork	Intermountain Healthcare	33
Timpanogos Regional Hospital	Orem	MountainStar Healthcare	117
Uintah Basin Medical Center	Roosevelt	Independent	35
University of Utah Hospital	Salt Lake City	University of Utah	585
Utah State Hospital	Provo	Utah Department of Human Services	324
Utah Valley Hospital	Provo	Intermountain Healthcare	395
VA Hospital	Salt Lake City	United States Department of Veterans Affairs	48
Valley View Medical Center	Cedar City	Intermountain Healthcare	48

== Former hospitals in Utah ==
Name	City	Notes
Cottonwood Hospital	Murray	
Deseret Hospital	Salt Lake City	Opened 1882, operated by the Relief Society. Closed in 1893.
Salt Lake County General Hospital	Salt Lake City	General hospital operated by Salt Lake County. Opened in 1912 and closed in 1965. Site became the county government offices.
Tooele Valley Hospital	Tooele	Formerly had 36 beds.
Veterans Administration Hospital	Salt Lake City	Opened in 1932 and closed in 1962.
