= American Fork Hospital =

- Intermountain Healthcare

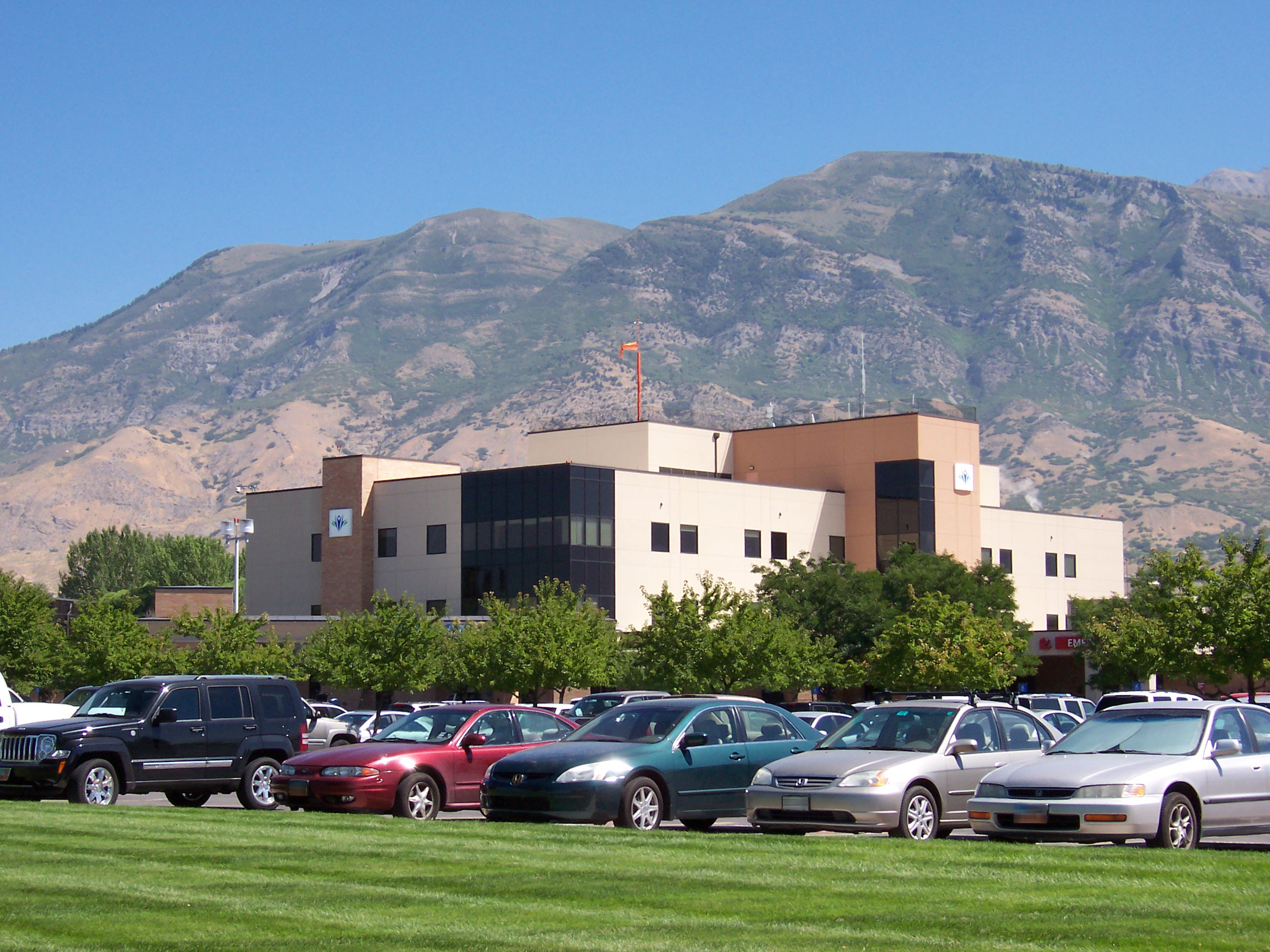

Geography
- Location: 170 North 1100 East; American Fork, Utah, United States
- Coordinates: 40°22′50″N 111°46′02″W

Organization
- Care system: Private
- Type: General

Services
- Emergency department: Level III trauma center

History
- Founded: 1937

Links
- Website: Official website
- Lists: Hospitals in Utah

American Fork Hospital is a hospital located in American Fork, Utah, United States, is fully accredited by the Joint Commission on Accreditation of Healthcare Organizations, and is a service of Intermountain Healthcare, a nonprofit health care system serving the Intermountain West. It is a Level III Trauma Center. Hospital services include a 27-suite women's center that features single-room birthing, and a 17-bed emergency department.

In 2021, American Fork Hospital opened a newborn intensive care unit. The facility has 20 individual rooms and can help babies born as early as 32 weeks after conception. 2,500 to 3,000 babies per year are born at American Fork Hospital.

== See also ==
- List of hospitals in Utah
