= Park City Hospital =

- Intermountain Healthcare
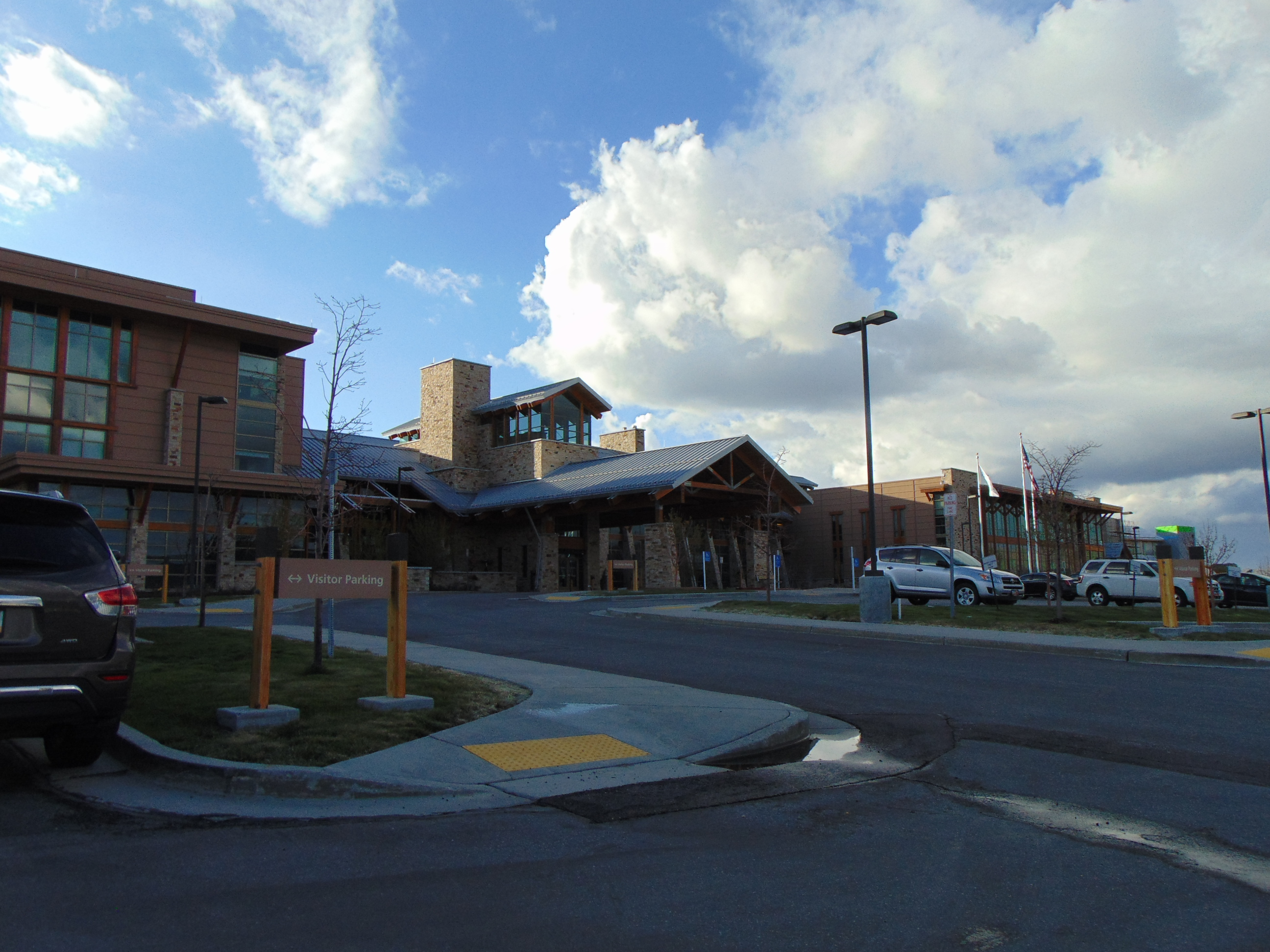
- Park City Hospital, April 2016

Geography
- Location: Park City, Utah, United States
- Coordinates: 40°41′15″N 111°28′09″W

Organization
- Care system: Private

History
- Founded: 15 September 2009

Links
- Website: intermountainhealthcare.org/hospitals/parkcitymedical/
- Lists: Hospitals in Utah

Park City Hospital (formerly Park City Medical Center) is a full-service community hospital in Park City, Utah, United States. It is located at 900 Round Valley Drive at the northwest corner of Keetley Junction US-40/US-189 and SR-248 (Kearns Boulevard). It a service of Intermountain Healthcare, a nonprofit health care system serving the Intermountain West.

Park City Medical Center opened 15 September 2009.

== See also ==
- List of hospitals in Utah
