= Sanpete Valley Hospital =

- Intermountain Healthcare

Geography
- Location: Mount Pleasant, Utah, United States
- Coordinates: 39°31′54″N 111°27′40″W

Organization
- Care system: Private

Links
- Website: Official website
- Lists: Hospitals in Utah

The Sanpete Valley Hospital is a critical access hospital located in Mount Pleasant, Utah, United States. A full medical staff of general surgeons, radiologists and ten family practice physicians work at the hospital. Sanpete Valley Hospital is one of two hospitals located in Central Utah and is in Sanpete County. It is part of the Intermountain Healthcare system.
