= LDS Hospital =

Hospital in Salt Lake City, Utah, US

- Intermountain Healthcare
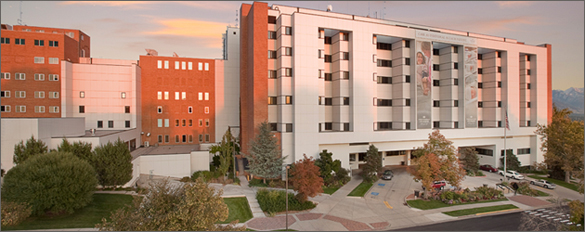

Geography
- Location: Salt Lake City, Utah, United States
- Coordinates: 40°46′43″N 111°52′47″W

Services
- Emergency department: Yes
- Beds: 262

Helipads
- Helipad: Yes

History
- Former name: Dr. W. H. Groves Latter-day Saints' Hospital
- Opened: January 9, 1905

Links
- Website: Official website
- Lists: Hospitals in Utah

LDS Hospital (formerly Dr. W. H. Groves Latter-day Saints' Hospital) is a 262-bed community hospital and surgical center in Salt Lake City, Utah. Accredited by the Joint Commission, the hospital is owned and operated by Intermountain Health. It was the company's flagship hospital until the opening of Intermountain Medical Center in 2007.

Located in the Avenues neighborhood of the city, the hospital opened in January 1905. It was built and operated by the Church of Jesus Christ of Latter-day Saints (LDS Church), and named after Dr. William H. Groves, who bequeathed funds for its construction. A school of nursing was operated by the hospital from 1905 until 1955. In 1975, the church transferred its hospital system—including LDS Hospital—to the newly created Intermountain Health Care (IHC). IHC then initiated a substantial expansion of the facility, which was completed in 1984.

In September 2026, Intermountain Health announced that LDS Hospital would relocate to a newly constructed campus in downtown Salt Lake City, with construction expected to begin that November.

== History ==
In 1872, the Episcopal Church opened St. Mark's Hospital—the first hospital in Salt Lake City—and in 1875, the Catholic Church followed suit by opening the city's second hospital, Holy Cross Hospital.

Desiring to establish their own institution, a number of Latter-day Saints (mostly women belonging to the Relief Society) petitioned and received permission from the church's First Presidency to establish the Deseret Hospital. After acquiring the building recently vacated by Holy Cross Hospital, the new LDS-run hospital was dedicated and opened on July 17, 1882. Utah Territory's pioneer women, including Romania B. Pratt, Ellis Reynolds Shipp, and Martha Hughes Cannon, played a significant role in the operation of Deseret Hospital. However, the hospital was closed in November 1893 due to having no regular financial endowment and because its building was inadequate for healthcare. After the closure of Deseret Hospital, many members of the LDS Church continued to desire a hospital operated by their religious organization.

=== Establishment ===
Dr. William H. Groves, a local dentist, died in 1895 and bequeathed his estate for the creation of an LDS-run hospital in Salt Lake City, which he stipulated be known as the Dr. W. H. Groves Latter-day Saints' Hospital. Following litigation over Groves' will with former family, approximately $50,000 was realized from the sale of the estate.

A hospital organization (controlled by the church's Presiding Bishopric) was incorporated on June 27, 1903, and construction on the building, at a site on the bench north of the city, began that summer. The property comprised an entire city block, with the hospital being centered thereon; this elevated bench location kept the building above the city's polluted air.

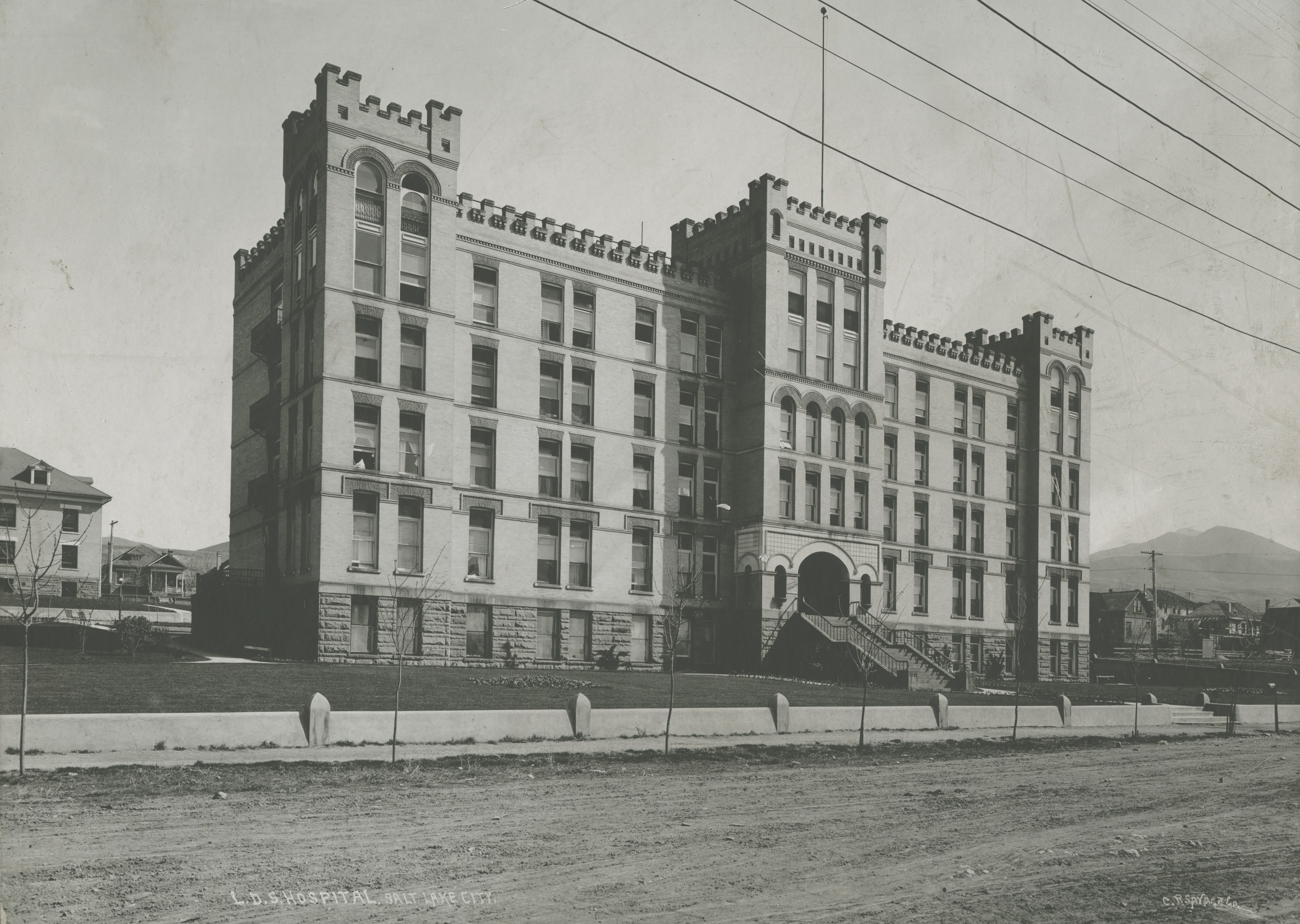
Dr. W. H. Groves Latter-day Saints' Hospital, circa 1908

The structure, built of cream-colored brick, was five stories high, including the basement level, and had three turreted towers. The basement held the dining room, kitchen, pantry and storage rooms, along with an X-ray room. The main floor, accessible via two flights of red sandstone stairs, included a vestibule with a wainscoting of tile and marble decoration up to the ceiling. The upper floors contained offices, staff quarters, and wards for males and females at opposite ends of the structure. On each floor, the rooms were connected with a hall running the full length of the building. The fifth floor contained the operating rooms, each located within the towers, along with the preparation and sterilization rooms.

To supplement the $50,000 provided by Groves, funds were given by private donors, along with the Salt Lake City Fifteenth Ward, which donated $10,000, and the LDS Church provided the remaining $115,000 needed to construct the hospital. In total, construction and equipment costs were approximately $175,000 (equivalent to $6,270,833 in 2025).

On January 4, 1905, a dedicatory program was held in the hospital's dining room, which included a prayer of dedication by LDS Church president Joseph F. Smith. A public reception was then held on January 6, and the hospital opened to the public on Monday, January 9.

=== LDS Church era (1905–1975) ===
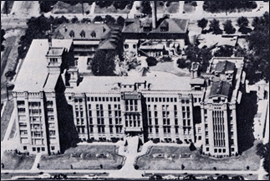
LDS Hospital following the addition of wings on the east and west ends

A six-story wing was completed on the hospital's east side in early 1914, providing space for nearly 100 more patients. A seven-story west wing, which included a roof top deck for sunbathing, was dedicated in September 1929; this wing brought the hospital's capacity up to 406. Over the subsequent years, additional floors were added atop both the original building and its two wings.

During the 1950s, the hospital underwent a significant expansion and modernization program. This included the construction of a new central wing on both the north and south sides of the hospital (connected by the original 1905 building). The brick work on the older sections of the hospital was refaced to match the new central wing, giving the entire hospital a new, uniform appearance. The south portion of the new central wing also included a ground-level entrance to the hospital, replacing the original second-level entrance access via stairs. The building program increased the hospital's capacity to 530 beds.

Beginning in the mid-1950s, LDS Hospital pioneered some of earliest methods of computer usage in medical care. These efforts were largely led by Homer R. Warner, director of the hospital's cardiovascular laboratory. By the 1960s, Warner and his staff had invented and deployed a computerized patient monitoring system, now a common feature in hospitals. While at the hospital, he also developed the HELP (Health Evaluation thru Logical Processing) system, the first computer program to use medical records and monitoring to suggest courses of treatment. The hospital's computerized MEDLAB program, developed in the 1960s, allowed for the monitoring of patients and collection of research data, including from patients in other nearby hospitals–such as Holy Cross and University of Utah Hospital–automatically via the telephone network.

In 1961, after the nearby church-owned Primary Children's Hospital had sufficiently grown, LDS Hospital closed its pediatric ward, sending children to that hospital instead.

LDS Hospital set up the first ICU, and pioneered a pulmonary function laboratory.

Another significant expansion to the hospital was dedicated in September 1968. This seven-story northeast wing upped the hospital's capacity to 570 beds, and added new space for the radiology department, computer systems, and two new surgical suites.

In 1970, the church announced all of its hospitals would be brought under the control of the newly created, church-controlled Health Services Corporation, led by James O. Mason. This included LDS Hospital, which saw its board of trustees dissolved and the board of the new corporation take control. However, LDS Hospital, like the other facilities in the newly formed company, was granted its own governing board made up of local community members. In December 1973, Health Services Corp. announced that LDS Hospital and Primary Children's Hospital would be integrated under a single administration and duplicative services would be merged, however the two hospitals would retain their separate identities.

=== Intermountain Health era (1975–present) ===
On April 1, 1975, the LDS Church/Health Services Corp. transferred its private hospital system, including LDS Hospital, to the newly created, independent Intermountain Health Care (IHC). The announced merger of LDS Hospital and Primary Children's Hospital from December 1973 was called off by IHC in July 1975, and separate boards of directors were established for the two hospitals.

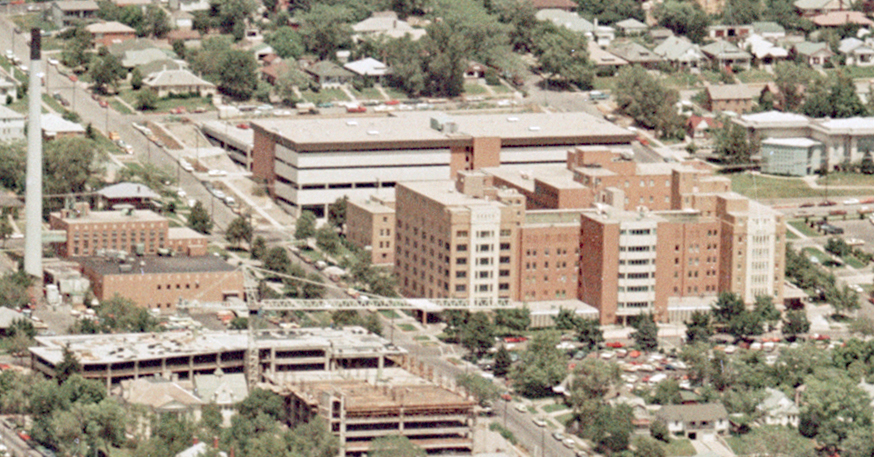
The hospital in 1978, following the addition of multiple wings and the Physicians Office Building on the block north of the hospital

In November 1978, the hospital opened the Physicians Office Building on the block directly north of the hospital. This addition included room for 31 physicians' offices, a pharmacy, space for the materials management and printing departments, along with a 300-stall parking garage. Costing $4.5 million (equivalent to $22,213,010 in 2025), its construction had been bitterly opposed by the hospital's neighbors.

During June 1984, a new seven-story, 458,000 square feet (42,500 m^{2}) addition to the hospital was dedicated. Sometimes called the replacement wing, the addition was built on the block to the south of the original hospital campus and required the closure of a portion of 8th Avenue to connect the addition directly to the older parts of the hospital. Costing $74 million (equivalent to $229,324,151 in 2025), $66 million was paid for with the issuance of hospital revenue bonds. The addition was designed by Henningson, Durham, and Richardson and included space for 364 beds (which combined with sections of the older hospital that would remain, totaled 520 beds). Also included in the construction was a heliport for Intermountain Life Flight atop of the roof. The first patients were moved into the new addition at the end of July 1984, after which the 1914 east and 1929 west wings were demolished. Much of the original 1905 building was also removed at this time, while the 1950s central wing and 1968 northeast wing remained and were remodeled (with a small section of the 1905 building left in place to connect the north and south portions of the central wing).

==== Transition to community hospital ====
In October 2007, IHC opened Intermountain Medical Center (IMC) in nearby Murray, Utah. At this time, LDS Hospital's transplant and critical care services, along with critical patients were transferred to the new center. LDS Hospital's status was changed to community hospital as IMC became the new flagship hospital in Intermountain Health's network.

After services were moved away, the hospital underwent a $32 million (equivalent to $44,876,069 in 2025) renovation as part of its transition to a community hospital. The remodeling cut the number of beds available by more than half, but greatly increased the size of rooms and suites. It also allowed remaining services, such as the "Joint Replacement Center" and Salt Lake Valley's only inpatient psychiatric center, to expand. Although the hospital never closed, a re-grand opening celebration was held in September 2012, following the completion of the nearly five-year-long renovation.

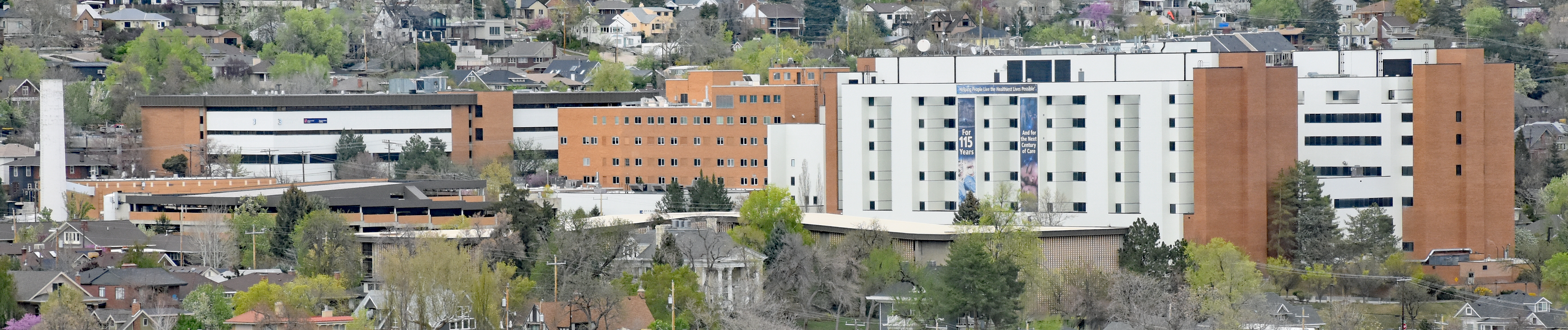
LDS Hospital campus, as seen in 2026

=== Relocation ===
In 2021, Intermountain Health purchased property along State Street in Salt Lake City's downtown, which had previously been home to a large Sears store. Over the course of the next several years, the healthcare organization worked with Salt Lake City to rezone the property for a hospital, which was approved in October 2024.

In September 2026, Intermountain Health shared plans to relocate LDS Hospital to a newly constructed campus on the downtown site. The new campus will include a 10-story hospital and seven-story medical office building. Construction is expected to begin with a groundbreaking ceremony in November 2026. Construction is estimated to take three to five years to complete.

== Honors ==
In 2003, LDS Hospital was one of the top hospitals in the United States for heart and orthopedic care by Money Magazine. LDS Hospital was named one of the United States' top teaching hospitals by Fortune Magazine in 2022 and "the top orthopedic hospital in the state of Utah" by US News & World Report in 2022.

== School of Nursing ==
=== History ===
Lacking adequately trained nurses in the area, the hospital opened a nurses training school. Initially, nurses were housed in the hospital, but a separate nurses' home was quickly built. The first graduating class in 1906 had five graduates, some of whom had transferred from the nurses training school at St. Mark's Hospital. In 1924, LDS Hospital offered two courses: a three-year course for registered nurses and an eleven-month course for home nurses, although the latter only lasted two or three years due to insufficient resources.

In September 1920, the school registered with the New York State Board of Regents, and through the extension division, it became affiliated with the University of Utah in September 1927. In 1942, course work expanded for nurses and allowed them to receive university credit for clinical courses. In 1952, the church's Brigham Young University (BYU) established a School of Nursing at its campus in Provo, which became affiliated with LDS Hospital the following year. In 1955, after 50 years of operation, the church closed LDS Hospital's School of Nursing in favor of BYU's program. 24 nurses made up the final graduating class of LDS Hospital's school.

=== School building ===
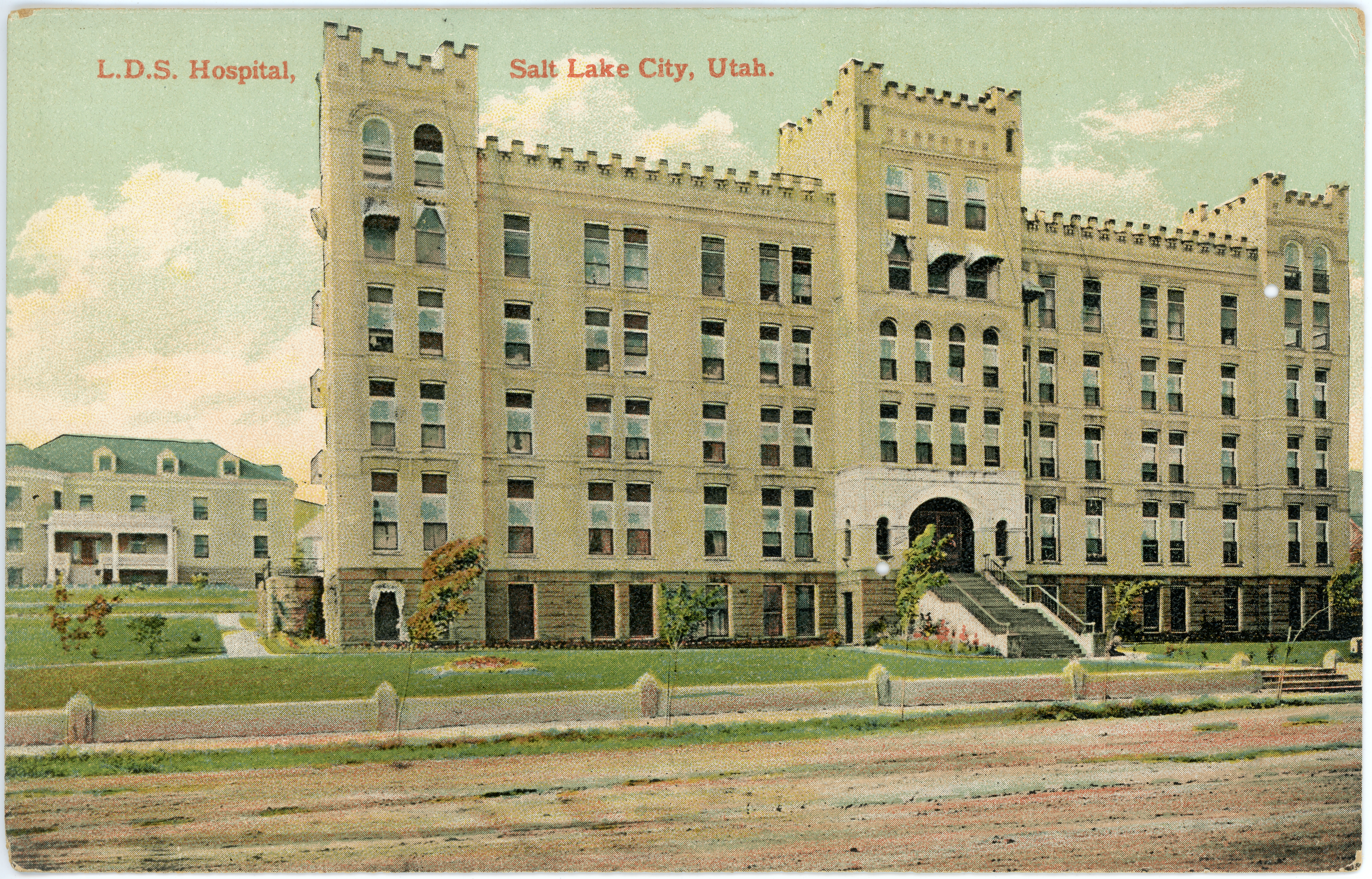
To the left of the original hospital building is the Nurses' Home and School, circa 1908

A four-story (including basement and attic levels) nurses' home was completed in 1905. Built on the northwest corner of the hospital block, it included bedrooms for the nurses, large parlors, a basement lecture room, and a library. It was dedicated in December 1905 by Robert T. Burton, a member of the church's presiding bishopric. In 1911, the building was substantially expanded allowing for up to 90 nurses to be housed, however the primary purpose of the project was to create a larger training school. Nurses stayed in tents on the hospital grounds during construction and moved indoors as construction wrapped up in late 1911.

The nurses' building underwent another significant remodel and expansion in the early 1950s. The school closed in 1955, and in time, the structure became known as the Northwest Annex. The annex was ultimately demolished following the completion of the hospital's 1984 addition.

== See also ==
- Behavioural sciences
- Primary Children's Hospital
