= Utah's 23rd State Senate district =

American legislative district

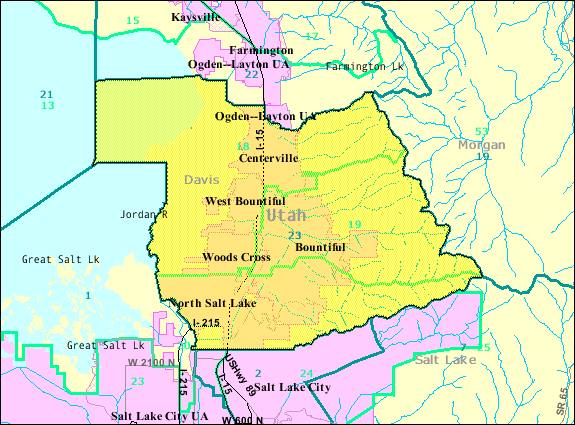
Map of the 23rd Utah Senate District.

The 23rd Utah Senate District is located in Davis County. The current State Senator representing the 23rd district is Keith Grover. Grover was elected in the 2022 election.

== Previous Utah State Senators (District 23) ==
Name	Party	Term
Dan Liljenquist	Republican	2009-2013
Dan Eastman	Republican	2000–2009
Lane Beattie	Republican	1989–2000
Jack M. Bangerter	Republican	1977–1988
Ezra T. Clark	Republican	1973–1976

== Election results ==
=== 2008 General Election ===
Utah State Senate election, 2008
Party	Candidate	Votes	%	±%
Republican	Dan Liljenquist	25,392	70.4	
Democratic	Richard Watson	9,455	26.2	
Constitution	Jorgina Hancock	1,198	3.3	

=== 2004 General Election ===
Utah State Senate election, 2004
Party	Candidate	Votes	%	±%
Republican	Dan R. Eastman	26,218	72.4	
Democratic	Dean W. Collinwood	9,332	25.8	
Constitution	Thomas L. Rodgers	672	1.9	

== See also ==
- Dan Eastman
- Utah Democratic Party
- Utah Republican Party
- Utah Senate
