= Mountain West Medical Center =

Geography
- Location: 2055 North Main Street, Tooele, Utah, United States
- Coordinates: 40°34′00″N 112°17′50″W

Organization
- Type: General

Services
- Emergency department: Yes
- Beds: 44

Links
- Website: www.mountainwestmc.com
- Lists: Hospitals in Utah

Mountain West Medical Center is a 44-bed hospital in Tooele, Utah, with 38 active, 32 allied and 41 courtesy members of the Medical Staff.

This hospital is an Accredited Chest Pain, Stroke Receiving Facility, and Designated Trauma Center.

Services offered include 24-hour Emergency Department; Med/Surg Unit; Intensive Care; Cardiology; Cardiopulmonary Services; Imaging Services with CT, MRI, X-Ray, Nuclear Medicine, Mammography, Ultrasound, QCT Bone Density; General Surgery, Laboratory, Obstetrics & Gynecology; Physical and Occupational Therapy; Orthopedics; Tele-Stroke, Tele-Neuro; Tele-NICU; Urology; and EMS.

Their ER measures wait-time in real-time and pledges to patients that they will be seen by a professional in under 30 minutes.

== History ==
In 1951, voters in Tooele County approved a bond for the construction of a county hospital, which was completed in 1953 on the south side of Tooele City and named the Tooele Valley Medical Center. "From 1953 to 1980 the center was managed by the county under the direction of an administrator." Management of the hospital changed several times over the subsequent years.

In 2002, the old center was replaced by a newly constructed hospital on the north side of the city built by Community Health Care Systems, who by that time had purchased the old medical center and sold it to Rocky Mountain Care. The new hospital, called Mountain West Medical Center, opened in May 2002.

In 2016, the hospital came under the management of Quorum Health Corporation as part of a hospital spinoff by Community Health Care Systems. In 2019, the hospital became affiliated with the University of Utah Health, which made additional resources and services available to patients of the hospital.

In 2020, Mountain West Medical Center made an alliance with the University of Utah Health Care in order to offer a wider range of services to the community.
