= Moab Regional Hospital =

Coordinates: 38°34′30″N 109°33′33″W

Geography
- Location: 450 West Williams Way Moab, Utah, United States

Organization
- Type: General

Services
- Emergency department: Level IV trauma center
- Beds: 17

History
- Founded: 14 February 2011

Links
- Website: mrhmoab.org
- Lists: Hospitals in Utah

Moab Regional Hospital is a non-profit, critical access hospital with a Level IV Trauma Center in Moab, Utah. It opened on February 14, 2011.

== Services ==
The Moab Regional Hospital offers the following services: Emergency Department, urgent care, dermatology, general/orthopedic surgical services, primary care, radiology, obstetrical services, cancer therapy, laboratory, and visiting specialists in oncology, podiatry, cardiology, urology, neurology, gynecology and plastic surgery. The hospital has a helipad located on the northeast side of the hospital.
