= Orem Community Hospital =

- Intermountain Healthcare

Geography
- Location: Orem, Utah, United States
- Coordinates: 40°18′10″N 111°42′30″W

Organization
- Care system: Private

Services
- Beds: 18

Links
- Website: Official website
- Lists: Hospitals in Utah

Orem Community Hospital (OCH) is located Orem, Utah, United States and is part of the Intermountain Healthcare system.

== Description ==
OCH specializes in outpatient services including obstetrics and same day surgery. Its relationship with Utah Valley Hospital means OCH has the backup and support of a larger hospital, while at the same time maintaining the personalized care expected from a community hospital.

OCH features 24 LDRP rooms, where mothers labor, deliver, recover and spend their postpartum stay all in the same room. This is a unique birthing option in Utah County. In 2008, 1,426 babies were delivered at the hospital.

== History ==
OCH opened in 1981 as a maternity hospital, with first birth happening June 30 1981. and after five years and a 13,000-square-foot (1,200 m^{2}) expansion OCH became a full-service hospital, with an emergency room, Women's Center, medical surgical, laboratory, x-ray and health education services.

In 1995, the Central Orem Health Center addition was completed along with a WorkMed unit and the Utah Valley Pediatric Rehabilitation Center. A beautification of the campus began with the addition of a jogging path around the campus and soccer fields in conjunction with Orem City.

== Hospital quality ==
The Hospital earned three out of five stars for OB-GYN service, according to the Healthgrades website.
