= Dan Eastman =

American politician

Member of the Utah Senate from the 23rd district
- In office 2000–2008
- Preceded by: Lane Beattie
- Succeeded by: Dan Liljenquist

Personal details
- Born: March 12, 1946
- Died: June 8, 2010 (aged 64) Bountiful, Utah, U.S.
- Party: Republican
- Education: Weber State University; Utah State University

Dan R. Eastman (March 12, 1946 – June 8, 2010) was an American politician and car salesman who served as a member of the Utah State Senate.

== Early life and education ==
Eastman was born on March 12, 1946, in Salt Lake City to Afton Joyce Bowen and Robert Charles Eastman. He was educated in the Davis School District and graduated from Bountiful High School in 1964.

Eastman studied at Weber State University and Utah State University. Prior to his election to the Utah State Legislature, he served on the Davis School Board.

== Career ==
Eastman served in the Utah National Guard. He worked for some years in the banking industry in Southern Nevada and Salt Lake City before buying a Jeep dealership in Bountiful, Utah. Eastman operated the dealership for 20 years.

In 1999, Eastman sold his auto dealerships to Barry Engle for an estimated $30 million.

Eastman was elected as a member of the Utah State Senate in 2000, representing the state's 23rd senate district in Bountiful. His campaign was almost completely self-financed. He was elected again in 2004 but did not seek re-election in 2008 choosing to retire citing his health.

Eastman was the Senate's Minority Whip from 2004 until 2008.

== Personal life ==
In 2001, Eastman was involved in a fatal car crash that killed a woman after he swerved his truck into oncoming traffic. No charges were ever filed although investigators concluded that it was Eastman's fault.

In 2009, Eastman underwent a kidney transplant, receiving a donated kidney from his daughter.

Eastman had five children with his wife, Claudette Eastman (née Crawford). Eastman died in Bountiful, Utah, on June 8, 2010, from heart failure. He was 64 years old.
