= Sevier Valley Hospital =

- Intermountain Healthcare

Geography
- Location: Richfield, Utah, United States
- Coordinates: 38°46′58″N 112°05′00″W

Organization
- Type: Community

Services
- Standards: Joint Commission on Accreditation of Healthcare Organizations

Links
- Website: intermountainhealthcare.org/locations/sevier-valley-hospital
- Lists: Hospitals in Utah

Sevier Valley Hospital is a hospital located in Richfield, Utah, United States, offering healthcare to the rural communities of Sevier, Wayne and Piute counties.

The hospital is part of the Intermountain Healthcare system, and is accredited by the Joint Commission on Accreditation of Healthcare Organizations.
