= Mountain View Hospital (Payson, Utah) =

- Hospital Corporation of America
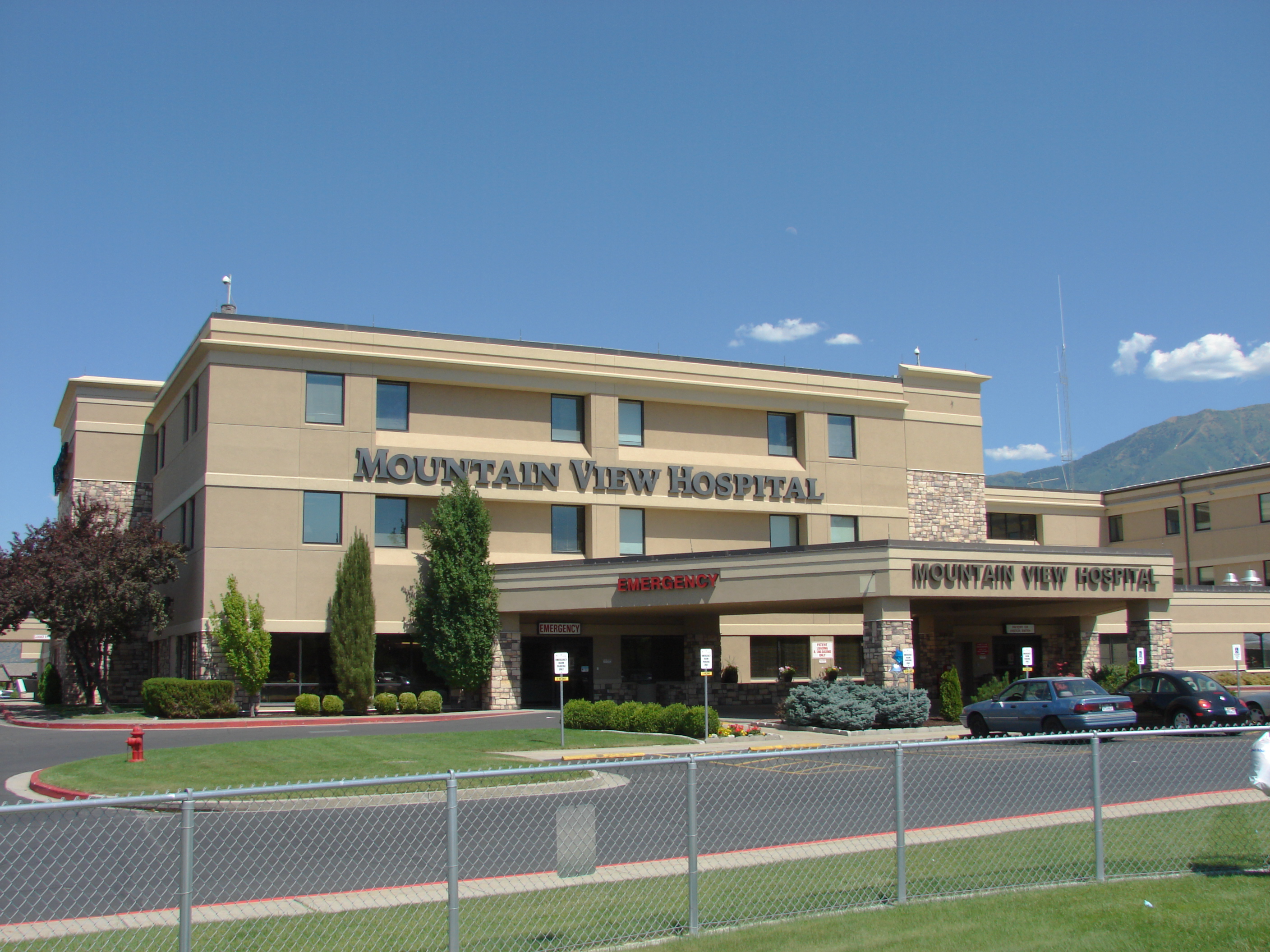
- Mountain View Hospital in Payson, Utah

Geography
- Location: 1000 East 100 North, Payson, Utah County, Utah, United States
- Coordinates: 40°02′38″N 111°42′50″W

Services
- Emergency department: Level IV trauma center
- Beds: 124

History
- Opened: 1914

Links
- Website: www.mvhpayson.com
- Lists: Hospitals in Utah

Mountain View Hospital is a JCAHO accredited, 124-bed hospital in Payson, Utah, which has provided medical care to the south Utah County community from its current location for more than 30 years. The hospital was started in 1914 by Dr. A.L. Curtis above the Wilson Drug Store in Payson.
