= Gunnison Valley Hospital =

Coordinates: 39°09′22″N 111°48′59″W

Gunnison Valley Hospital Special Service District

Geography
- Location: 64 East 100 North PO Box 759 Gunnison, UT 84634, Utah, USA

Services
- Beds: 24

History
- Founded: 1932

Links
- Website: http://gvhospital.org/
- Lists: Hospitals in Utah

Gunnison Valley Hospital, located in Gunnison, Utah is a rural facility with 25 private beds, 3 Labor/Delivery Rooms, state-of-the-art Operating and Recovery Rooms, Radiology Unit, Labs, Home Health and Hospice and a Cancer Treatment Center in addition to being a Critical Access Hospital (CAH).

== History ==
The history of the Gunnison Valley Hospital Special Service District dates back to 1932 when the founding doctor, G. Stanford Rees, opened up his doctor's office in Gunnison and began practicing Family Medicine. From that small office in 1932, the practice grew and Rees expanded and built a hospital in Gunnison in the 1940s. That hospital was the first hospital in the entire county of Sanpete. In 1970 the hospital moved to a new building and new location, which is the location where the hospital still resides.

The hospital experienced financial difficulties in the late 1980s to the early 1990s. In 1994 the citizens of the area voted to support and back the hospital with tax payer funds by making the hospital a public entity in the form of a Special Service District formed under Utah's laws.

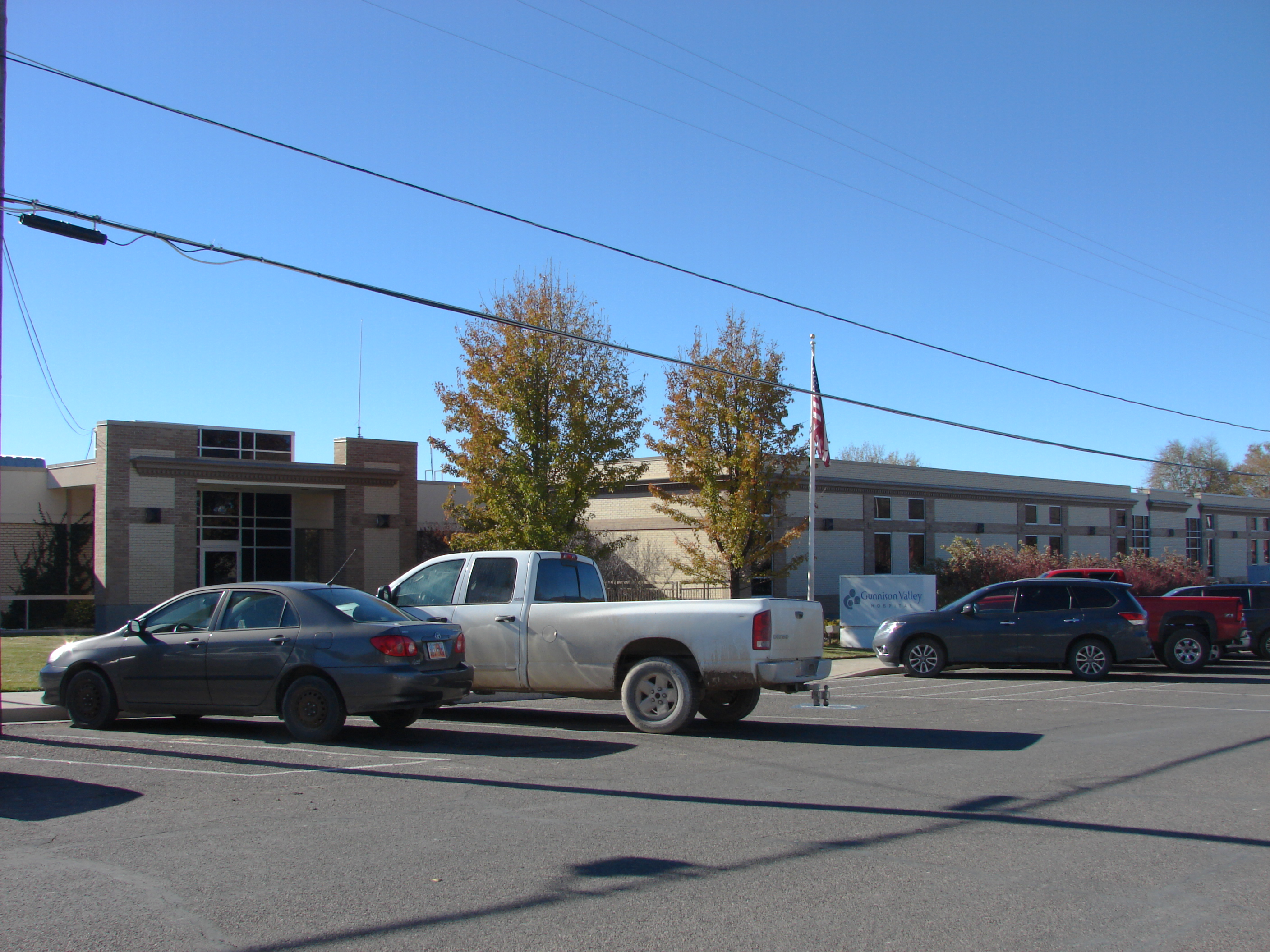
Gunnison Valley Hospital (front view) in the town of Gunnison, Utah.

Currently, the hospital features 25 private patient rooms, three family friendly delivery suites, two operating suites, a full-service laboratory, and imaging services featuring not only X-ray, but CT scanning, fluoroscopy studies, digital mammography, ultrasound and MRIs; all linked with a picture archival computer system (PACS).

== Governance & Administration ==
The Gunnison Valley Hospital Special Service District is governed by a Board of Directors and an executive team.

The board members for the 2017 year include: (1) Jeanette Andersen; (2) Steve Anderson; (3) LaMar B. Bartholomew; (4) Shawn Crane; (5) Nancy Jensen; (6) Cary Judy (Medical Staff Board Member); (7) Brian Murray (Chief Financial Officer of the hospital); and (8) Kim R. .Picket.

The 2017 executive leadership for the Gunnison Valley Hospital includes:

Executive Leadership of Gunnison Valley Hospital (2017)
| Name | Title | Position Start |
|---|---|---|
| Mark Dalley | Administrator and chief executive officer (CEO) | 2011 |
| Brian Murray | Chief Financial Officer (CFO) | 1997 |
| Brenda Bartholomew | Chief Nursing Officer (CNO) | unknown |

== Recognitions ==
The Gunnison Valley Hospital Special Service District was named a "top 100 Critical Access Hospital" by Analytics. The hospital sponsors a scholarship award for the community high schoolers.

== Annual budgets ==
The reported annual budget for the Gunnison Valley Hospital per the Utah Transparency Website includes the following:

Gunnison Valley Hospital Special Service District Finances 2013 – 2018
| Year | Expenses | Revenue | Expenses for Salaries | Employee Compensation |
|---|---|---|---|---|
| 2013 | $16,772,443.24 | $17,721,450.13 | $6,304,826.23 | $2,588,000.90 |
| 2014 | $15,907,021.61 | $17,269,493.49 | $5,508,591.44 | $2,364,636.38 |
| 2015 | $21,683,349.55 | $23,313,914.58 | $5,561,016.13 | $2,251,078.60 |
| 2016 | $22,705,536.66 | $25,204,307.57 | $6,044,933.76 | $2,617,525.55 |
| 2017 | $27,699,104.83 | $28,493,719.12 | $6,917,597.98 | $3,002,648.49 |
| 2018 | $34,423,291.49 | $36,806,451.51 | $6,612,312.11 | $2,841,857.33 |

== See also ==
- List of hospitals in Utah
