= Garfield Memorial Hospital =

- Intermountain Healthcare/Garfield County, Utah
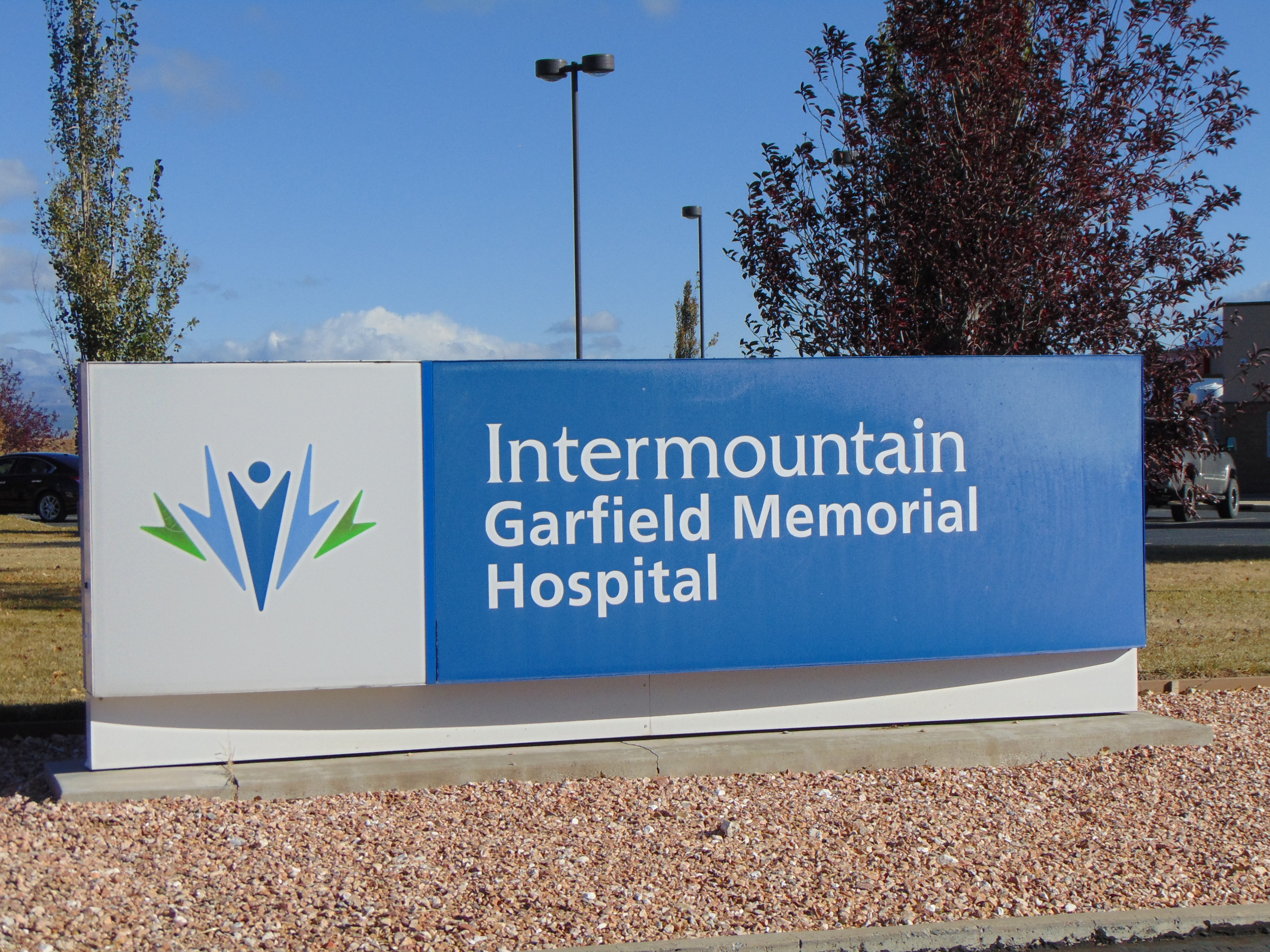
- Garfield Memorial Hospital sign, October 2017

Geography
- Location: Panguitch, Utah, United States
- Coordinates: 37°49′35″N 112°25′36″W

Organization
- Care system: Private

Services
- Beds: 41

Links
- Website: intermountainhealthcare.org/locations/garfield-memorial-hospital/
- Lists: Hospitals in Utah

Garfield Memorial Hospital is a small hospital with 41 beds and two trauma rooms, located at 200 North 400 East in Panguitch, Utah, United States. In 2008, the Department of Health and Human Services HCAHPS survey named Garfield the highest-rated hospital in the United States in terms of patient satisfaction. Although owned by Garfield County, it is part of the Intermountain Healthcare system (a nonprofit health care system serving the Intermountain West), and is fully accredited by the Joint Commission on Accreditation of Healthcare Organizations.

== History ==
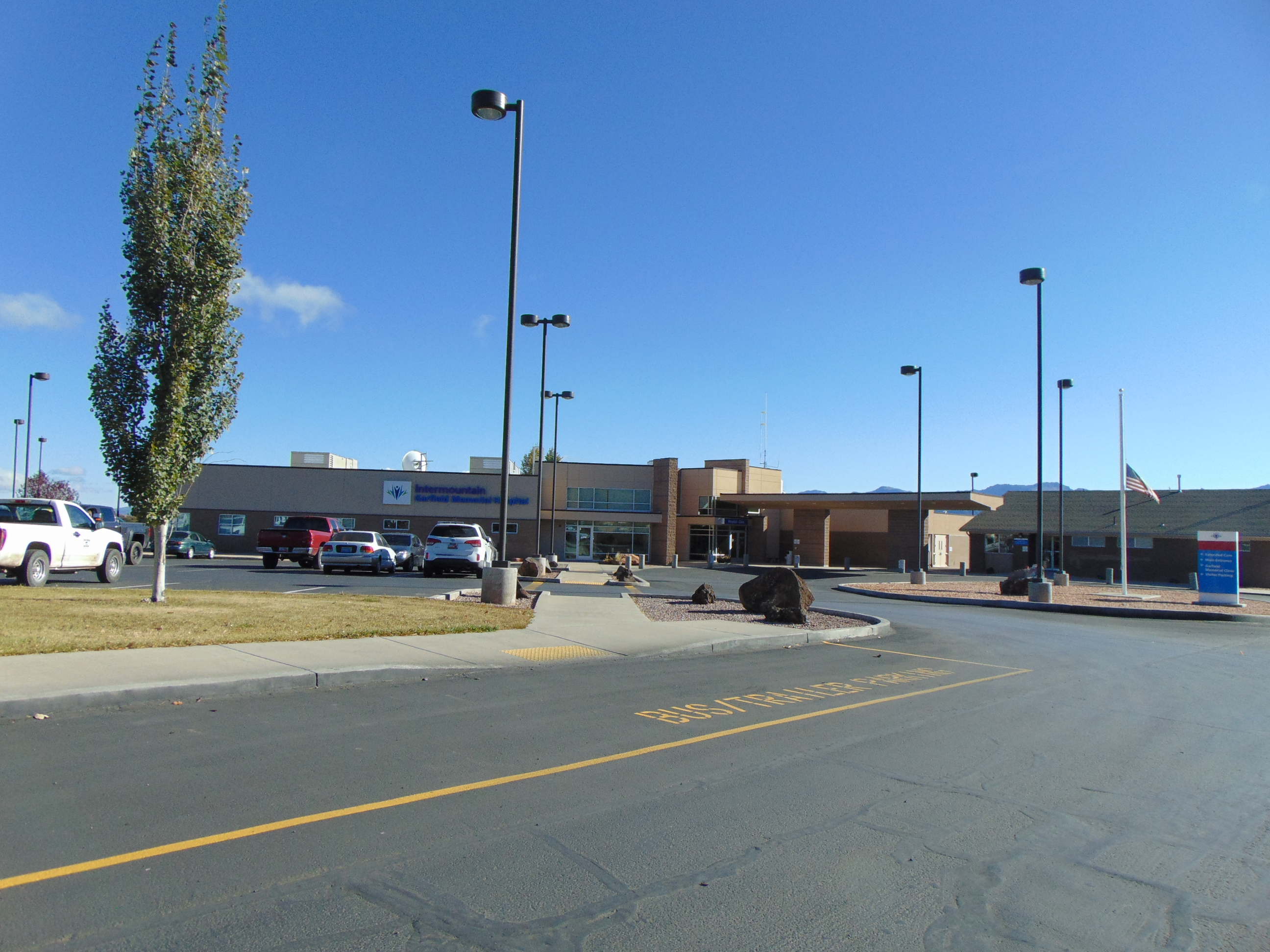
Looking northeast at the Garfield Memorial Hospital, October 2017

The Garfield Memorial Hospital was built by the Church of Jesus Christ of Latter-day Saints (LDS Church) starting in 1975 with a combination of fundraisers, direct donations, private donations, and government grants. However, before it was completed in 1976, the LDS Church divested itself of its hospitals and turned over operations to a newly formed nonprofit organization. This new organization, Intermountain Healthcare (but then known as Intermountain Health Care [IHC]), assumed the operations of fifteen hospitals in Utah, Southeastern Idaho, and Southwestern Wyoming, including the Garfield Memorial Hospital. However, even though the hospital was operated by IHC, it was actually owned by Garfield County for its first decade. Notwithstanding, IHC obtained ownership for the second decade of operation before it reverted to back to Garfield County in the year 2000. Despite the changes in ownership, it has been continually operated by Intermountain Healthcare. In 1996, an additional wing was added to the hospital.

== See also ==
- List of hospitals in Utah
