= Alta View Hospital =

- Intermountain Healthcare
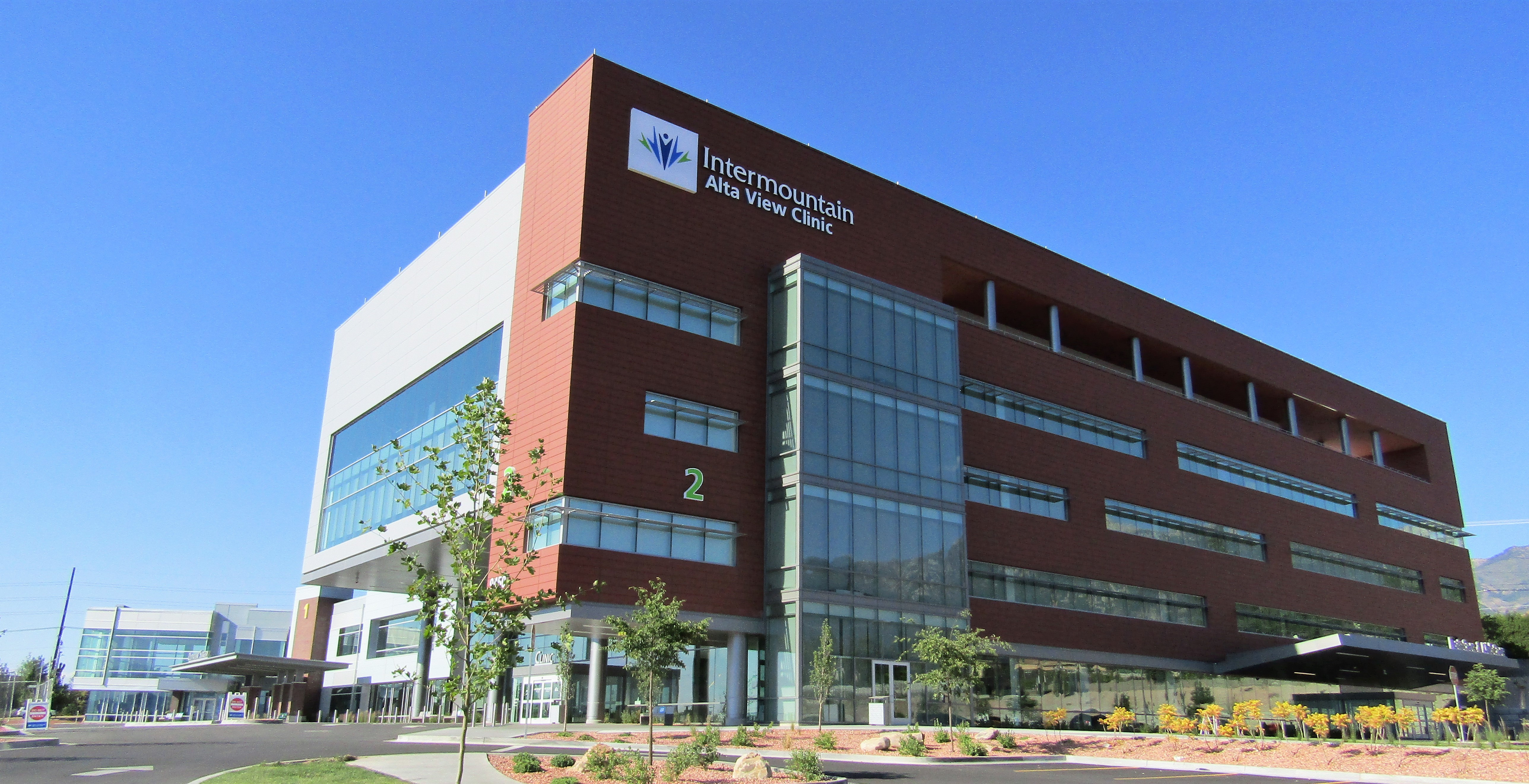
- Intermountain Alta View Clinic

Geography
- Location: Sandy, Utah
- Coordinates: 40°34′40″N 111°51′14″W

Alta View Hospital is an Intermountain Healthcare member hospital located in Sandy, Utah, United States. In 2019, the hospital completed a renovation that resulted in a new emergency department, new inpatient physical therapy space and a rooftop helipad.

== History ==
Alta View Hospital opened in 1982.

In December 2017, the hospital opened the Alta View Clinic. In February 2019, the hospital completed a $140 million expansion project. In 2019, the hospital was named on IBM Watson Health's Top 100 Hospitals list.

=== Hostage incident ===
The Alta View Hospital hostage incident began the night of September 20, 1991, when Richard Worthington, armed with a shotgun, a handgun and sticks of dynamite arrived at Alta View Hospital in an attempt to kill Dr. Glade Curtis, who had performed a tubal ligation on his wife. Worthington held the hostages for eighteen hours. He was talked into surrendering and releasing the remaining hostages by Sergeant Don Bell and Detective Jill Candland of the Salt Lake City police department. A nurse was killed by Worthington in the incident.
