= Logan Regional Hospital =

- Intermountain Healthcare
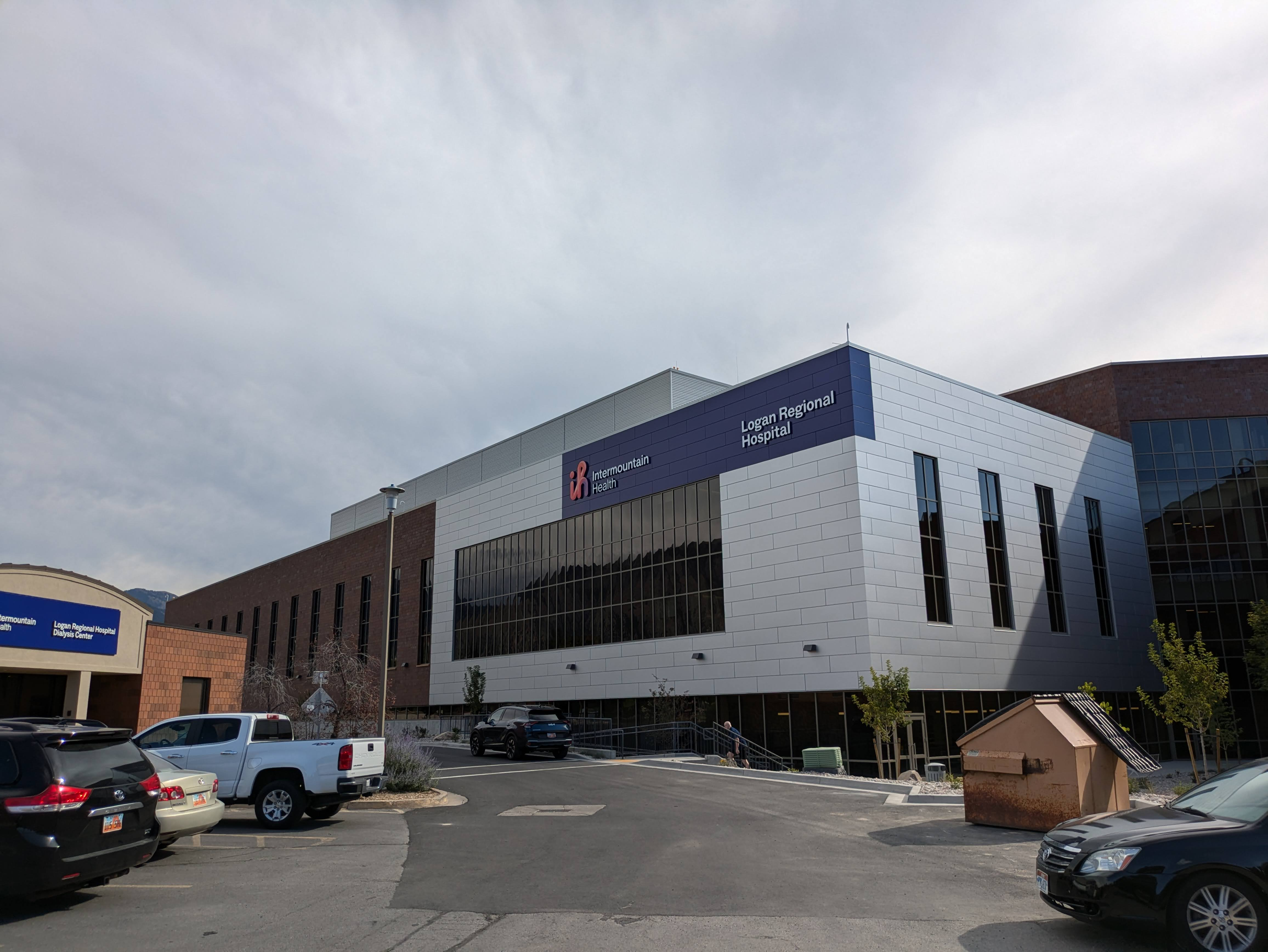

Geography
- Location: Logan, Utah, United States
- Coordinates: 41.757444°N 111.821111°W

Organization
- Funding: Non-profit hospital

Services
- Standards: Accredited by the Joint Commission
- Emergency department: Level III Trauma Center
- Beds: 146
- Helipad: Yes

History
- Opened: 1975

Links
- Website: Official website
- Lists: Hospitals in Utah
- Other links: Hospitals in Utah

Logan Regional Hospital is a 146-bed general hospital located in Logan, Utah. It is owned by Intermountain Healthcare. The hospital serves Cache Valley, including Cache County, Utah and Franklin County, Idaho, and western Wyoming. Logan Regional's mission is "Helping People Live the Healthiest Lives Possible." The hospital services include a Level III Trauma Center, Cancer Center, Women and Newborn Center, digital imaging services, and heart catheterization services. Logan Regional was named one of the United States' 100 top hospitals in 2018, marking the sixth consecutive year it has received this honor.

== History ==
The predecessor to Logan Regional Hospital, and Cache Valley's first hospital, was the William Budge Memorial Hospital. Built in 1914, it was a 50-bed facility that offered operating rooms and maternity care. In 1948, The Church of Jesus Christ of Latter-day Saints acquired Cache Valley's two hospitals, The Budge Memorial Hospital and Cache Valley General Hospital, as part of the church's health system. In 1975, The Church of Jesus Christ of Latter-day Saints turned over its system of 15 hospitals, including Logan LDS Hospital, to the communities they served. A secular, not-for-profit health care system, Intermountain Healthcare was formed to operate the hospital system. Logan LDS Hospital was renamed Logan Hospital. The hospital relocated in 1980 to a larger, more modern facility where they continue to operate. Since relocating, Logan Regional has added the Intermountain Budge Clinic (opened in 2000) to the hospital campus, a Women and Newborn Center (opened in 2007), and a Cancer Center (opened in 2008). In 2015, Logan Regional Hospital and the Budge Clinic expanded its facility by 154,000 square feet.

== Services ==
Logan Regional provides cancer services, a level III trauma center, heart services, inpatient care units, outpatient services, rehabilitation and therapy, a sleep center, sports medicine, orthopedics, surgical services, a Women and Newborn Center, Wound and Hyperbaric Center, a Nutrition and Weight Center, and a Community Education Center.

=== Cancer services ===
Logan Regional provides cancer services including brachytherapy, chemotherapy, and radiation oncology services. In addition to cancer screenings and support services, the cancer center is accredited as an Intermountain Cancer Center, and is recognized for providing patients with access to a full scope of services required to diagnose, treat, rehabilitate, and support patients with cancer.

=== Cardiac services ===
In 2012, Logan Regional added two new heart catheterization labs which provide diagnostic and an interventional heart program, specialized radiology services and pain management procedures. These services were provided for in part by more than $400,000 in donations.

=== Orthopedics and sports medicine ===
Logan Regional's Certified Sports Medicine Physicians provide a full range of sports medicine and orthopedic care for athletes, including a concussion clinic. Logan Regional Orthopedics and Sports Medicine is the official medical provider for:

- Utah State University
- Sky View High School
- Mountain Crest High School
- Ridgeline High School
- Green Canyon High School

=== Women & newborn center ===
Logan Regional provides services for pregnancy, labor & delivery, breastfeeding support, a neonatal care unit, and a mammography and imaging center. With an average of 2,500 babies born at the hospital each year, this is the largest service provided at Logan Regional.
