= Civica Rx =

American generic pharmaceutical manufacturer

- Industry: Generic drug development
- Founded: September 6, 2018
- Headquarters: Lehi, Utah
- Key people: Ned McCoy (President and CEO)
- Website: www.civicarx.org

Civica Rx is a nonprofit generic drug company founded in 2018 by leading U.S. health systems and philanthropies for the purpose of preventing and mitigating drug shortages in the United States, and the price hikes that can accompany them.

Civica's mission is to make quality generic medicines accessible and affordable to everyone. Civica's business model is based on the Healthcare Utility concept.

Hospital pharmacists and physicians help prioritize what medications Civica provides. Member hospitals sign long-term purchase and supply contracts with Civica, adding stability to the market. Civica targets six months of extra inventory, enabling it to buffer any supply shortages in the market. While serving 55 health systems and 1,500 hospitals (or 1/3 of all licensed U.S. hospital beds), Civica also supplies the U.S. Department of Veterans Affairs, the U.S. Department of Defense, and “340B” hospitals caring for vulnerable patients in some of the country’s most underserved areas.

As of April 2025, Civica reported distributing more than 210 million vials or syringes of essential medicines, which it states is enough to treat over 97 million patients in the United States.

Civica is growing U.S. generic drug manufacturing capabilities with a new 140,000 square-foot sterile injectable manufacturing facility in Petersburg, Virginia, representing a $124.5 million investment. The plant has the capacity to produce 90 million vials and 50 million prefilled syringes of essential medications per year and includes a high-speed filling line for additional pre-filled insulin pen capacity.

The first shipment of Civica private-label medication was vancomycin, delivered to Riverton Hospital, a part of Civica founder health system Intermountain Healthcare, in October 2019. During the pandemic, 11 of Civica's 80+ medications were used to help COVID-19 patients, including neuromuscular blocking agents, sedation agents and pain management medications for patients on ventilators.

== Partnerships and deals ==
In 2020, Civica and 18 Blue Cross Blue Shield plans announced an initiative to lower the cost of certain high-priced generic drugs for consumers at the pharmacy counter. The entity named CivicaScript builds on the mission of Civica to reach consumers directly with quality outpatient generic medicines that are affordable and available. CivicaScript's first product, abiraterone acetate 250 mg, is used to treat prostate cancer. CivicaScript's price for the medication is approximately $3,000 per month less than the average cost for someone with Medicare Part D.

In January 2021, Civica Rx announced its plans to build an essential medicines manufacturing facility in Virginia, part of a partnership with Virginia-based Phlow Corp to produce sterile injectable medications used in hospitals for COVID-19 patient care, emergency room and intensive-care unit treatments, surgeries, and to treat other serious conditions. Civica is a key collaborator in the U.S. government-funded partnership with Phlow Corp, Medicines for All Institute at Virginia Commonwealth University and AMPAC Fine Chemicals.

In March 2023, California Gov. Gavin Newsom (D) announced a $50M 10-year deal with Civica to provide affordable insulin (vials and pre-filled pen cartridges) to residents, part of the state's broader CalRx initiative to offer prescription drugs at low cost for all Californians.
