= Alta View Hospital hostage incident =

1991 attack in Sandy, Utah, US

Coordinates: 40°34′40″N 111°51′14″W

The Alta View Hospital hostage incident began September 20, 1991, when Richard Worthington, armed with a shotgun, a .357 Magnum revolver, and sticks of dynamite arrived at Alta View Hospital in Sandy, Utah, in an attempt to kill Dr. Glade Curtis, who had performed a tubal ligation requested by his wife, Karen Worthington.

Worthington entered the Hospital's Women's Center and took as hostages two nurses, a patient giving birth, her sister, the father, and two newborn babies. Curtis saw what was happening and hid in his office, where he called the police. After Worthington took nurses Susan Woolley and Karla Roth to the parking lot, the police told him to freeze and Roth attempted to wrestle Worthington's shotgun from his hands and was fatally shot.

Worthington held the hostages for eighteen hours. He was talked into surrendering and releasing the remaining hostages by Sergeant Don Bell and Detective Jill Candland of the Salt Lake City police department. Worthington was sentenced to thirty-five years in prison for the murder of Roth, and later committed suicide in his prison cell on November 11, 1993.

The incident was portrayed in the 1992 TV movie Deliver Them From Evil: The Taking of Alta View, starring Harry Hamlin as Worthington, Teri Garr as Woolley and Terry O'Quinn as Bell.

== Later family incidents ==
In November of 2022, a hostage incident occurred in Herriman, Utah, that involved a suicidal man. SWAT were called to the scene for an hours-long standoff until the man, identified as Alma Worthington, a Utah National Guard veteran, opened fire on the authorities trying to evacuate the neighbors, but the SWAT took action and shot Worthington, killing him. A few weeks later, Alma Worthington was identified as Richard Worthington's son.
