= Intermountain Health =

Healthcare organization in the western United States

- Type: Private (Not-for-profit)
- Industry: Healthcare
- Predecessor: The Health Services Corporation of the Church of Jesus Christ of Latter-day Saints
- Founded: Salt Lake City, Utah, US (September 24, 1970)
- Founder: Presiding Bishopric of the Church of Jesus Christ of Latter-day Saints
- Headquarters: Salt Lake City, Utah, United States
- Area served: Colorado, Idaho, Montana, Nevada, Utah, and Wyoming
- Key people: Rob Allen (President)
- Number of employees: 68,000
- Website: intermountainhealthcare.org

Intermountain Health (formerly Intermountain Healthcare) is a United States not-for-profit healthcare system with 385 clinics and 33 hospitals in the Intermountain West (primarily Colorado, Idaho, Montana, Nevada, and Utah). The company's headquarters are in Salt Lake City, Utah. Colorado-based SCL Health and Intermountain Health merged in 2022. The combined system employs more than 64,000 people. Rob Allen serves as the current President and CEO of Intermountain Health.

== History ==
Intermountain Health was founded on April 1, 1975, after the Church of Jesus Christ of Latter-day Saints donated fifteen hospitals, as a system, to what would become Intermountain Health.

In 1982, Intermountain Health began providing non-hospital services, including clinics and home healthcare.

In 2006, Intermountain renamed its health insurance plan "SelectHealth" and formalized the separate management of its insurance operations.

In 2009, President Barack Obama identified Intermountain Health as a healthcare model: "We have long known that some places, like the Intermountain Healthcare in Utah..., offer high-quality care at a cost below average." According to the Kaiser Family Foundation, Utah's per capita spending on healthcare is 44 percent below the national average.

Intermountain Health announced that beginning in 2011, it would offer health insurance benefits for its employees' domestic partners.

In response to drug shortages and pricing scandals, Intermountain Health and other hospitals formed a generic drug manufacturer, Civica Rx, in 2018 to produce generic drugs that are in short supply or highly priced.

In early October 2020, Intermountain Health acquired Saltzer Health of Idaho from Tommy Ahlquist following a failed acquisition of Saltzer Health by St. Luke's Boise Medical Center.

In late October 2020, Intermountain Health and Sanford Health signed an intent to merge. The merger would make Sanford Health a subsidiary of Intermountain Health with the resulting system consisting of 70 hospitals with 89,000 employees. In early December, the merger was postponed indefinitely after the C.E.O. of Sanford Health, Kelby Krabbenhoft, was abruptly replaced by Bill Gassen after Krabbenhoft voiced anti-mask sentiments.

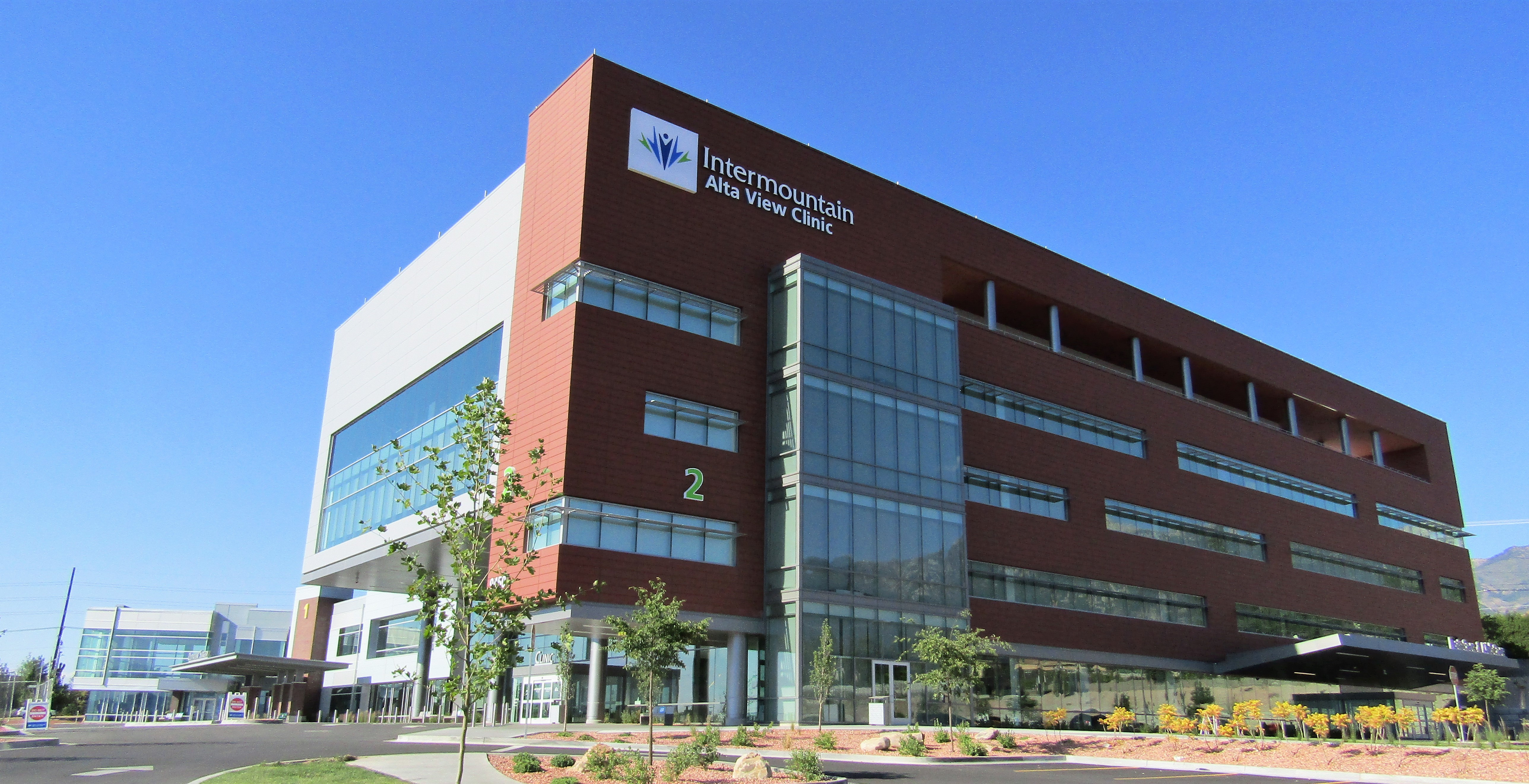
Intermountain Alta View Clinic

In early 2022, Intermountain Health launched a program for people with long-haul COVID-19 symptoms.

Intermountain completed a merger with SCL Health on April 1, 2022, expanding the healthcare system's reach into Colorado, Kansas, and Montana.

Intermountain changed its name from Intermountain Healthcare to Intermountain Health in 2023.

Intermountain constructed the Lehi Primary Children's Hospital for roughly $335 million between 2020 and 2024. Gail Miller, who formerly chaired Intermountain's board, donated $50 million toward the construction of Lehi Primary Children's Hospital. The campus was named in honor of her family. The hospital began accepting patients on February 12, 2024

Intermountain closed its Duchesne Clinic in Kansas City on June 1, 2026. It also transferred ownership of two of its three Kansas clinics to Atchison Community Health Clinic on June 30, 2024, ending its presence in Kansas.

In July 2026, Intermountain Health announced a joint venture with AdventHealth, in which Intermountain will transfer operational responsibility for its Denver metropolitan area facilities Good Samaritan Hospital, Lutheran Hospital and Platte Valley Hopsital. On November 16, it was announced that Saint Joseph Hospital would also join the joint venture.

== Hospitals ==
Intermountain Health operates 33 hospitals in Utah, Colorado, Idaho, and Montana, with 4,700 licensed beds, as listed in the table below.

Facility Name	City	State	Licensed Beds	Staffed Beds	Designation	Coordinates
Alta View Hospital	Sandy	Utah	71	66	Level IV Trauma Center	40°34′39.2″N 111°51′11.8″W
American Fork Hospital	American Fork	Utah	109	109	Level III Trauma Center	40°22′50.1″N 111°46′9.3″W
Bear River Valley Hospital	Tremonton	Utah	16	16	Level IV Trauma Center	41°43′32.4″N 112°10′52.8″W
Cassia Regional Hospital	Burley	Idaho	25	25		42°32′3.3″N 113°47′0.5″W
Cedar City Hospital	Cedar City	Utah	48	48	Level IV Trauma Center Critical Access Hospital	37°42′0″N 113°3′50.6″W
Delta Community Hospital	Delta	Utah	18	18	Level IV Trauma Center	39°21′0.54″N 112°33′39.64″W
Fillmore Community Hospital	Fillmore	Utah	19	19	Level IV Trauma Center Critical Access Hospital	38°57′17.14″N 112°20′24.72″W
Garfield Memorial Hospital & Clinics	Panguitch	Utah	41	41	Level IV Trauma Center	37°49′28.7″N 112°25′40.5″W
Good Samaritan Medical Center	Lafayette	Colorado	290	290	Level II Trauma Center	39°58′14″N 105°05′11″W
Heber Valley Hospital	Heber	Utah	19	16	Level IV Trauma Center Critical Access Hospital	40°29′23.31″N 111°24′27.03″W
Holy Rosary Healthcare	Miles City	Montana	25	25	Level IV Trauma Center	46°23′43″N 105°49′41″W
Intermountain Health Lutheran Hospital	Wheat Ridge	Colorado	226		Level II Trauma Center	39°46′18″N 105°08′44″W
Intermountain Primary Children's Hospital, Larry H. and Gail Miller Family Campus in Lehi	Lehi	Utah	66			40°24′53″N 111°53′57″W
Intermountain Medical Center	Murray	Utah	504	504	Level I Trauma Center	40°39′43.2″N 111°53′35.7″W
Intermountain Layton Hospital	Layton	Utah	43	43	Level III Trauma Center	41°03′06.1″N 111°58′14.1″W
LDS Hospital	Salt Lake City	Utah	250	250	Level IV Trauma Center	40°46′42.6″N 111°52′50″W
Logan Regional Hospital	Logan	Utah	146	128	Level III Trauma Center	41°45′26.8″N 111°49′16″W
McKay-Dee Hospital	Ogden	Utah	321	312	Level II Trauma Center	41°11′0.1″N 111°56′56.3″W
Orem Community Hospital	Orem	Utah	24	18		40°18′10″N 111°42′30″W
Park City Hospital	Park City	Utah	37	37	Level IV Trauma Center	40°41′15.69″N 111°28′9.9″W
Platte Valley Medical Center	Brighton	Colorado	98	98	Level III Trauma Center	39°57′52″N 104°46′07″W
Primary Children's Hospital	Salt Lake City	Utah	289	289	Level I Trauma Center	40°46′16″N 111°50′20″W
Riverton Hospital	Riverton	Utah	97	88	Level IV Trauma Center	40°31′20.5″N 111°58′47.7″W
Saint Joseph Hospital	Denver	Colorado	369	369	Level II Trauma Center	39°44′43.4″N 104°58′7.3″W
Sanpete Valley Hospital	Mt. Pleasant	Utah	18	18	Level IV Trauma Center Critical Access Hospital	39°31′56″N 111°27′40.3″W
Sevier Valley Hospital	Richfield	Utah	29	24	Level IV Trauma Center	38°46′58″N 112°05′00″W
Spanish Fork Hospital	Spanish Fork	Utah	33	33	Level IV Trauma Center	40°7′51.46″N 111°38′35.148″W
St. Mary's Medical Center	Grand Junction	Colorado	310	310	Level II Trauma Center	39°05′24″N 108°33′46″W
St. George Regional Hospital	St. George	Utah	284	284	Level II Trauma Center	37°06′00″N 113°33′13″W
St. James Healthcare	Butte	Montana	69	69	Level III Trauma Center	46°00′31″N 112°32′45″W
St. Vincent Regional Hospital	Billings	Montana	222	222	Level I Trauma Center	45°47′32″N 108°31′03″W
The Orthopedic Specialty Hospital (TOSH)	Murray	Utah	40	40		40°38′35.3″N 111°52′56.6″W
Utah Valley Hospital	Provo	Utah	395	359	Level II Trauma Center	40°14′50.7″N 111°40′1.6″W

== Life Flight ==
Intermountain Healthcare Life Flight logo (since 2005)

Life Flight is an air ambulance service affiliated with Intermountain Health. They originally began service in 1972 with fixed-winged aircraft, but on July 6, 1978, it performed its first patient transport by helicopter, becoming the seventh helicopter (rotor wing) air medical service in the United States.

Intermountain currently operates eight Agusta AW109 SP Grand helicopters. In addition to servicing Utah, Life Flight transports patients from Arizona, Idaho, Montana, Nevada, Wyoming, and other locations in the Western United States.

Life Flight and its staff are Commission on Accreditation of Medical Transport Systems (CAMTS) certified.

== See also ==
- List of hospitals in Utah
- Alta View Hospital hostage incident
