= Utah Valley Hospital =

- Intermountain Healthcare
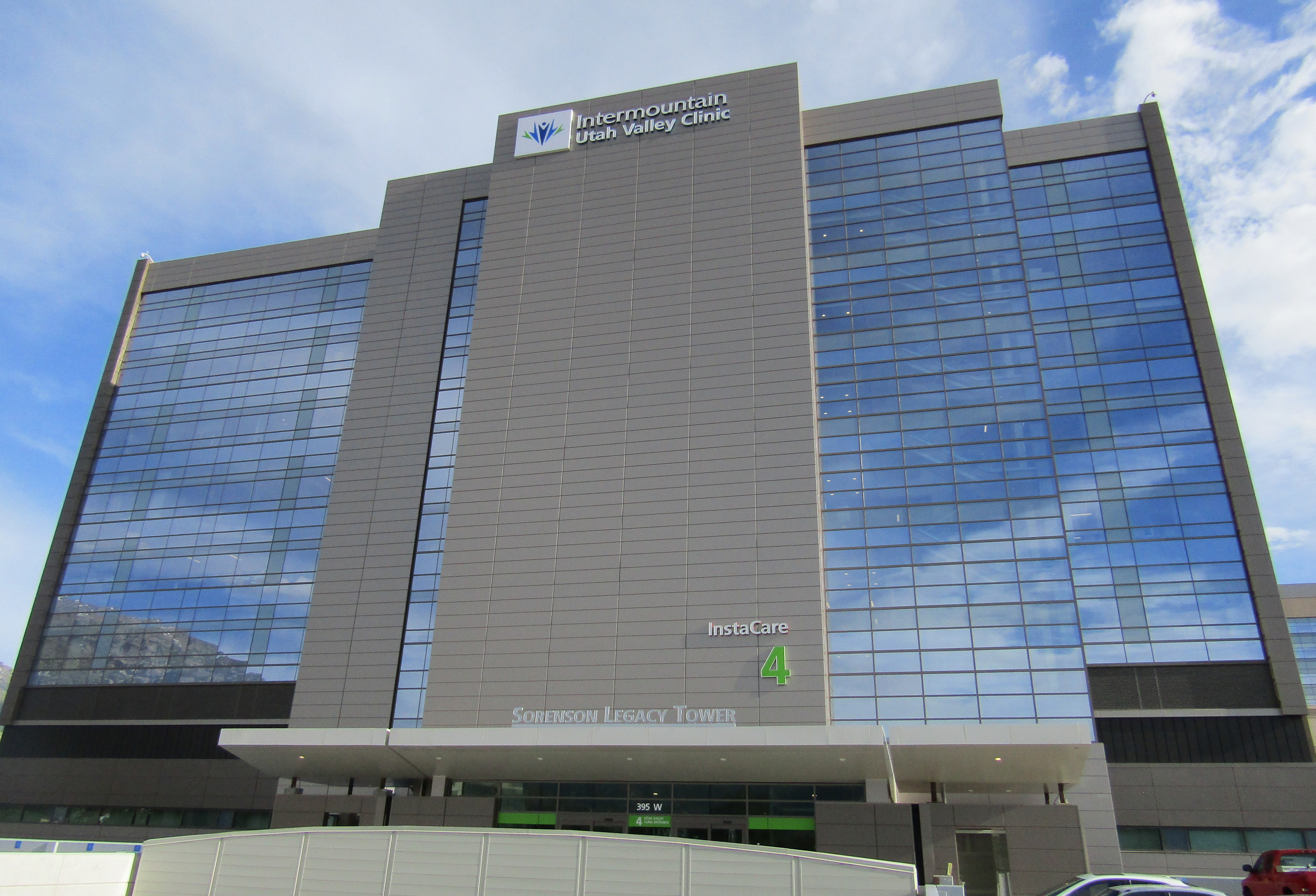

Geography
- Location: 1034 North 500 West; Provo, Utah, United States
- Coordinates: 40°14′50″N 111°39′57″W

Organization
- Care system: Private
- Type: General

Services
- Emergency department: Level II trauma center
- Beds: 395

History
- Founded: 1939

Links
- Website: Homepage
- Lists: Hospitals in Utah

Utah Valley Hospital (UVH) is a 395-bed full-service tertiary and acute care referral center serving Utah County, central and southern Utah that is part of the Intermountain Healthcare system. It is a Level II Trauma Center. From 1984 to 2016, the facility was called Utah Valley Regional Medical Center (UVRMC).

== History ==
Originally founded in 1939 as Utah Valley Hospital, UVH was equipped with 55 bed and 38 physicians. By 1953 through request of the board of directors, The Church of Jesus Christ of Latter-day Saints assumed ownership of Utah Valley Hospital. Utah Valley Hospital became the first fully staffed 24-hour emergency center south of Salt Lake City by 1970.

In 1975, The Church of Jesus Christ of Latter-day Saints donated its network of hospitals, including UVH, to a new independent nonprofit entity, Intermountain Health Care, which has operated the hospitals ever since.

By 1984, the name of the hospital was officially changed to Utah Valley Regional Medical Center (UVRMC). The name change reflected growth of the facility and services, making it one of Utah's largest major referral centers, serving all of central and southern Utah and its surrounding areas.

In 2014, the hospital celebrated its 75th anniversary, and a major hospital replacement project is announced to eventually replace the East Tower and provide the latest technology and medical services to the community which would be set to start in 2015. The construction and replacement project included a 12-story patient tower on the southwest corner of campus, and a nine-story medical office building on the east side of campus. The expansion was partly funded by grants from Gail Miller, then owner of the Utah Jazz, and businessman Todd Pedersen, founder of Vivint.

By 2016, the facility's name was officially changed back to Utah Valley Hospital. It also opened the Utah Valley Hospital Primary Children's Network campus to offer pediatric care for patients and their families, closer to home for some than the main Primary Children's Hospital in Salt Lake City.

Offered programs include the Utah Valley Heart Center, the Newborn Intensive Care Unit (NICU) and Cancer Services. Other services include Emergency and Trauma Services, Critical Care, Women's and Children's Services, Behavioral Health and the Utah Valley Rehabilitation Center. The hospital's Cancer Center treats more than 20 forms of cancer. Life Flight has one of its air ambulance helicopters stationed at UVRMC.
