= Jack Bangerter =

American politician (1925–2008)

Jack Monson Bangerter (March 11, 1925 – July 31, 2008) was an American businessman and politician.

Born in Bountiful, Utah, Bangerter served in the United States Navy during World War II. He went to Harvard University, Cornell University, and University of Utah. He was president of J.C. Bangerter and Sons, Inc., a trucking company. From 1977 to 1989, Bangerter served in the Utah State Senate and was a Republican. He died in Salt Lake City, Utah.
