= Primary Children's Hospital =

- Intermountain Health

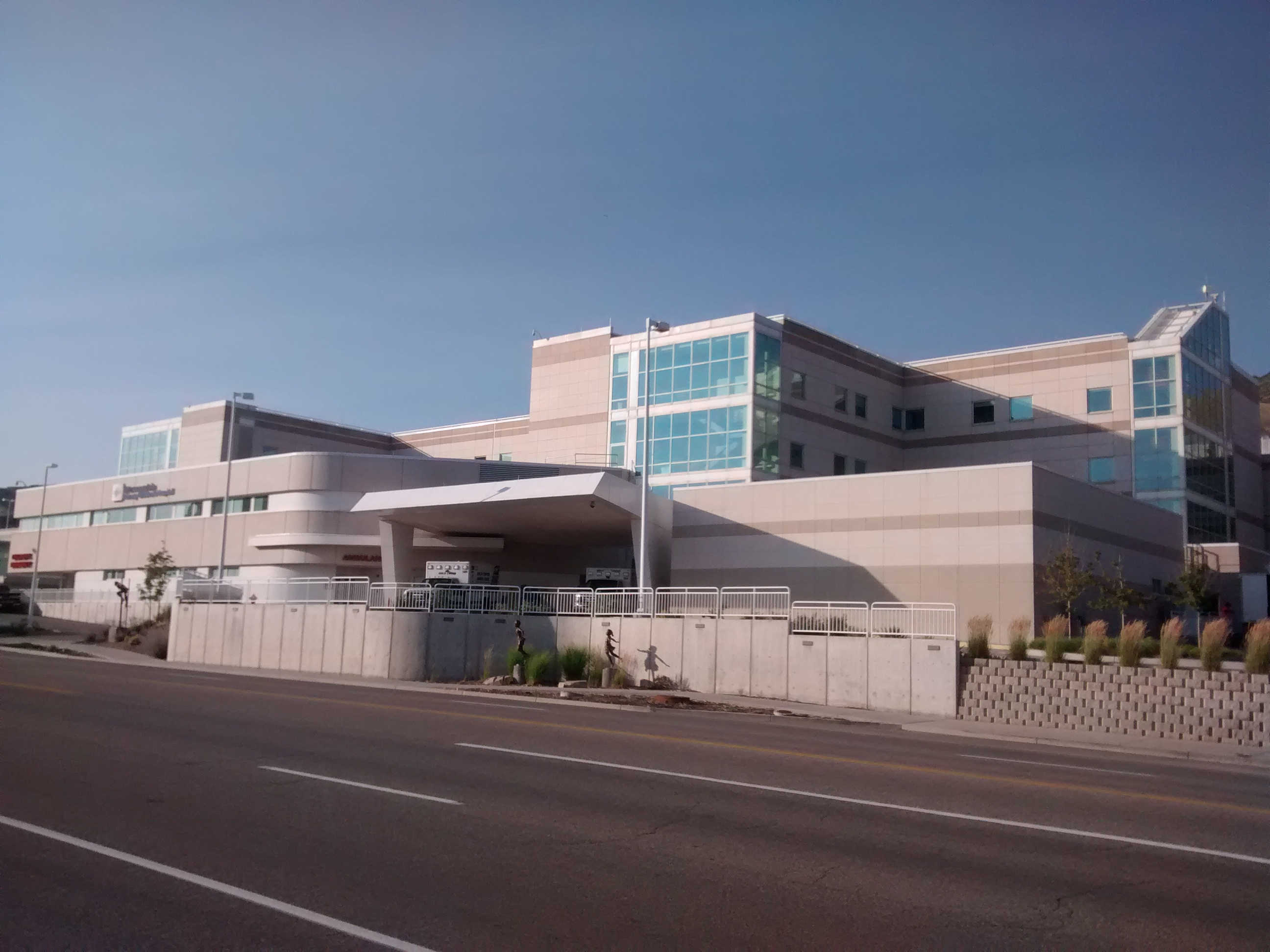
- The front of the main campus of Primary Children's Hospital.

Geography
- Location: 100 Mario Capecchi Drive, Salt Lake City, Utah, United States
- Coordinates: 40°46′16″N 111°50′20″W

Organization
- Care system: Intermountain Health
- Type: Pediatric
- Affiliated university: University of Utah School of Medicine

Services
- Emergency department: Level 1 Pediatric Trauma Center
- Beds: 289

Helipads
- Helipad: FAA LID: UT08
Number	Length		Surface
Number	ft	m	Surface
H1	40 x 40	12 × 12	concrete
H2	40 x 40	12 × 12	mats

History
- Former name: Primary Children's Medical Center
- Constructed: 199
- Founded: 1922

Links
- Website: Official website
- Lists: Hospitals in Utah
- Other links: List of hospitals in Utah

Intermountain Primary Children's Hospital (PCH) (formerly Primary Children's Medical Center) is a nationally ranked pediatric acute care children's teaching hospital located in Salt Lake City, Utah.

The hospital has 289 pediatric beds and is affiliated with the University of Utah School of Medicine. The hospital is a member of Intermountain Health and is the only children's hospital in the network.

The hospital provides comprehensive pediatric specialties and subspecialties to infants, children, teens, and young adults aged 0–21 throughout the Salt Lake City and outer region. PCH also sometimes treats adults that require pediatric care.

PCH is a ACS verified Level 1 Pediatric Trauma Center and is the largest providers of pediatric health services in the state. The hospital serves the states of Utah, Nevada, Idaho, Montana, and Wyoming, yielding a geographic catchment area of approximately 400,000 square miles. The hospital is one of the only pediatric hospitals in the region.

== History ==
PCH had its beginnings in the efforts of the Church of Jesus Christ of Latter-day Saints (LDS Church) to provide adequate medical care to citizens of the Western United States. An LDS organization and building, named "Deseret Hospital", was first founded in 1882 in Salt Lake City, but closed for financial reasons in 1900.

In 1911, some LDS Church leaders, including May Anderson and Louie B. Felt, pushed for a separate facility geared to needs of infants and young patients. By 1913, a children's ward had been established at LDS Hospital and by 1922 a separate facility for children was established in a large Salt Lake City house. It was run by the Primary Association (the LDS Church's organization for children), thus the name. During those years, the LDS Church encouraged its members to donate to the hospital's fund by an annual fundraising effort, "Pennies By The Inch", in which members were asked to donate as many pennies as they were tall (in inches).

From 1934 to 1974, the hospital building was referred to as PCH. On February 12, 1952, the hospital moved to a larger building located near the top of the Avenues area of Salt Lake. The building was substantially enlarged in 1966, gaining nearly twice its original area.

In 1974, the LDS Church decided to divest itself of the ownership and operation of several of its non-church-related activities such as health-care facilities. As a result, in 1975 its hospitals were turned over to the not-for-profit IHC group, which still owns and operates PCH. The Avenues facility was closed in 1990 and the hospital was moved to a larger facility on the medical campus of the University of Utah. University faculty provide care for patients at PCH, and the University of Utah pediatric residency program and medical school use it as their pediatric training site. The facility was known as Primary Children's Medical Center from 1974 to 2013 until the hospital was renamed to Primary Children's Hospital.

In January, 2020 PCH announced that a second hospital would be built in the Lehi region of Utah. The hospital is expected to cost $500 million and provide pediatric emergency care, intensive care, and behavioral health services.

In July 2020, PCH rolled out a new service for parents and families of babies that were in the neonatal intensive care unit (NICU). The service, run by AngelEye, provides video 24/7 to parents and families when they can't be in the NICU with their child.

In November 2025, Intermountain Health announced it had raised over $642 million for pediatric health in Utah.

== About ==
=== Patient care units ===
The hospital has a 32-bed pediatric intensive care unit to treat critically ill infants, children, teens, and young adults and a 50-bed AAP verified Level 4 neonatal intensive care unit to handle critically ill infants.

- 35-bed pediatric emergency department
- 32-bed PICU
- 16-bed CICU
- 28-bed neuro trauma unit
- 50-bed Level IV NICU
- 128-beds general pediatrics

=== Miller Family Campus in Lehi ===
The Larry and Gail Miller Family Foundation Campus of PCH opened on February 14, 2024. IHC built the new location to accommodate Utah County's rapid growth. This campus has 66 beds and offers an emergency room, neonatal intensive care, surgery rooms, advanced imaging, and other kinds of specialist care. The facility includes a Ronald McDonald Family Room, which is a home-like space for families of pediatric patients, including overnight rooms, meals, bathrooms, showers, and more.

In July of 2025, Sophie’s Place, a music therapy room opened at the Miller Family Campus of the hospital. Sophie’s Place is a playroom that mixes music, art and dance/movement therapy for seriously ill children. It was established in 2013, in memory of singer and songwriter Sophie Rose Barton, who volunteered at Primary Children’s Hospital. In 2010, Sophie died at the age of 17.

=== Ronald McDonald House ===
Primary Children's Hospital partners with Ronald McDonald House Charities of the Intermountain Area. The House was originally established in 1988 and has a capacity of 75 rooms for parents and families of infants, children, teens, and young adults aged 0–21 coming from over 60 miles outside of the area. In addition to the House, RMHC has Family Rooms on floors two, three, and four of Intermountain Primary Children's Hospital. These rooms include nap and overnight rooms, food and drink, and more, all free of charge.

=== Applied Behavior Analysis Clinic ===
The Primary Children's Hospital opened an outpatient clinic in Riverton, Utah for autistic children in April 2025. The clinic offers early intervention programs to children aged two to six. Services include diagnostics, individual therapy, and group therapy.

== Awards ==
In 2017, PCH was a semifinalist in the clinical care category of the Children's Hospital Association's annual Pediatric Quality Award.

In 2020–21, PCH has placed nationally in 8 ranked pediatric specialties on U.S. News & World Report.

In 2025, PCH was nationally ranked in 11 children's specialties on U.S. News & World Report's ranking. The hospital was also ranked #1 in Utah.

2025-26 U.S. News & World Report Rankings for Primary Children's Hospital
Pediatric Specialty	Rank (In the U.S.)
Cancer	#37
Cardiology & Heart Surgery	#12
Diabetes & Endocrinology	#37
Gastroenterology & GI Surgery	#20
Nephrology	#18
Neurology & Neurosurgery	#16
Orthopedics	#22
Urology	#22
Neonatology	#39
Pulmonology & Lung surgery	#42
Pediatric & Adolescent Behavioral Health	Top 50

== See also ==
- List of children's hospitals in the United States
