= Intermountain Medical Center =

Hospital in Murray, Utah, United States

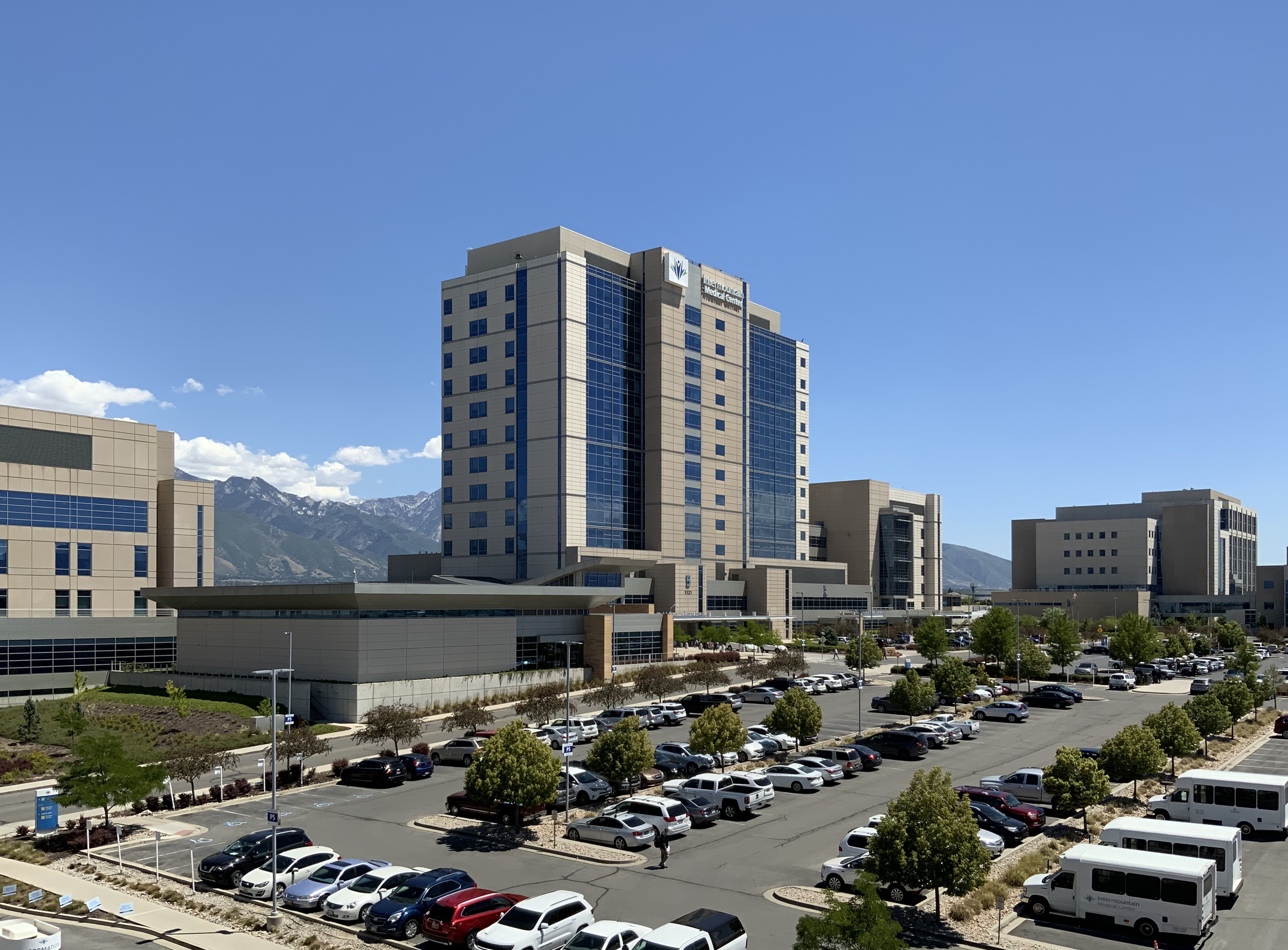
- Intermountain Medical Center

Geography
- Location: Murray, Utah
- Coordinates: 40°39′37″N 111°53′26″W

Services
- Emergency department: Level I trauma center
- Beds: 504

History
- Opened: 2007

Links
- Lists: Hospitals in Utah

Intermountain Medical Center is the flagship hospital of Intermountain Healthcare. Located in Murray, Utah, United States, on a 100-acre (0.40 km^{2}) site at the center of the Salt Lake Valley, Intermountain Medical Center serves as a major adult referral center for six surrounding states and more than 75 regional health care institutions. The hospital is also a Level I trauma center, accredited by the American College of Surgeons. It has 504 beds and is accredited by the Commission on Accreditation of Rehabilitation Facilities. Intermountain Medical Center opened in October 2007, and several premature babies were transferred by Intermountain Healthcare's Life Flight to the hospital on the first day for better treatment and care.

The hospital, the nearby parking lots, and the nearby Utah Transit Authority light rail station were built on the site of the former Asarco Murray lead smelter, which was reclaimed as part of an EPA Superfund program.

Intermountain Medical Center and University of Utah Hospital were tied for #1 atop rankings nearly 60 hospitals statewide, according to U.S. News & World Report's 2015-2016 "Best Hospitals" rankings.

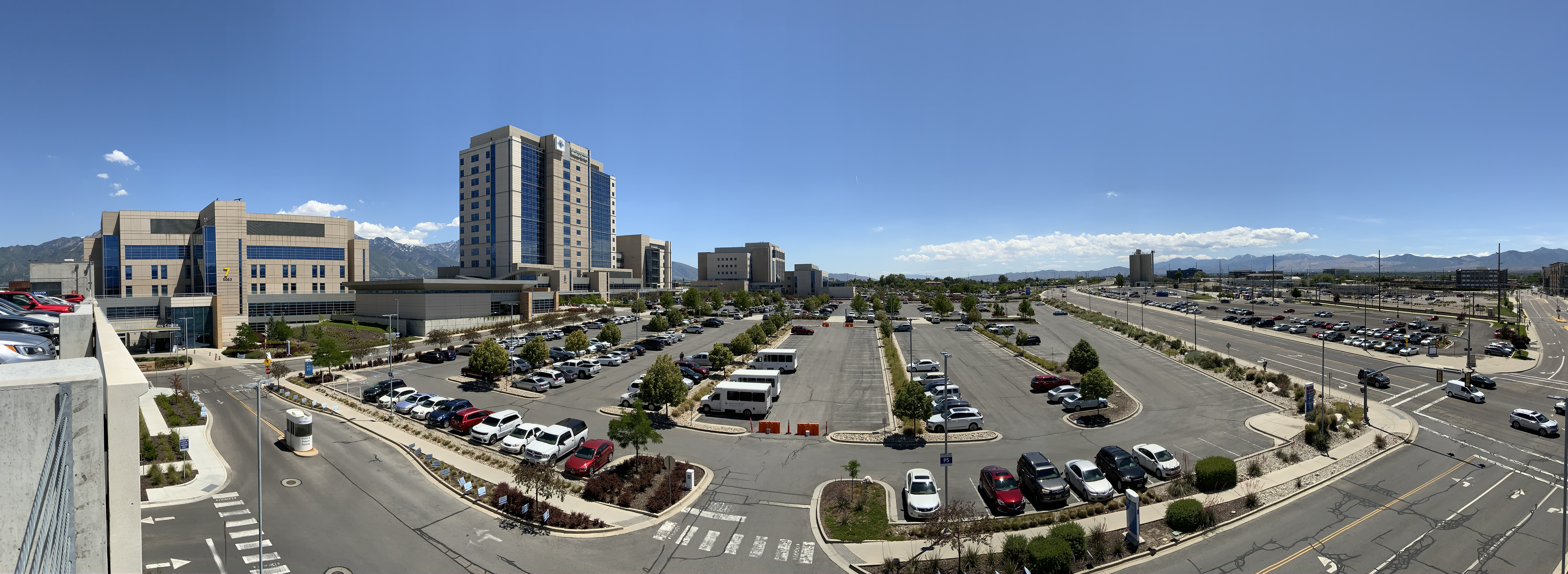
Panorama of the Intermountain Medical Center campus
