= Salt Lake City Police Department =

Municipal law enforcement agency in Salt Lake City, Utah, United States

- Flag of Salt Lake City, Utah
- Common name: Salt Lake City Police
- Abbreviation: SLCPD, SLPD
- Motto: Serving with Integrity

Agency overview
- Formed: 1851
- Employees: 620
- Annual budget: $70,901,619

Jurisdictional structure
- Operations jurisdiction: Salt Lake City, Utah, USA
- Map of Salt Lake City Police Department's jurisdiction
- Area: 110.4 square miles (286 km^{2})
- Population: 200,591
- Legal jurisdiction: Salt Lake City, Utah
- General nature: Local civilian police

Operational structure
- Headquarters: 475 South 300 East, Salt Lake City, Utah
- Police Officers: 567
- Civilians: 122
- Mayor of Salt Lake City responsible: Erin Mendenhall
- Agency executives: Brian Redd, Chief of Police; Andrew Wright, Deputy Chief - Administration Bureau; Victor Siebeneck, Deputy Chief - Investigations Bureau; Vacant, Deputy Chief - Field Operations Bureau
- Parent agency: Salt Lake City

Website
- SLCPD site

The Salt Lake City Police Department (SLCPD) is the municipal police force of Salt Lake City, Utah, United States.

The current chief of police, Brian Redd, was recommended by Mayor Erin Mendenhall on February 20, 2025, and approved by the Salt Lake City Council on March 5, 2025. Before leading the SLCPD, he was appointed as the executive director of the Utah Department of Corrections, and had previously served in the Utah DPS as a captain and the chief's executive agent.

== History ==
The SLCPD was founded in 1851 under the newly created city charter, when the mayor authorized a police department to be created. Forty men were appointed, earning 25 cents per hour.

The SLCPD is headquartered in downtown Salt Lake City, Utah, at 475 South and 300 East, one block east of the Salt Lake City Public Library. This headquarters is called the Salt Lake City Public Safety Building, and is shared with the Salt Lake City Fire Department.

The Salt Lake City Police Department is divided into three bureaus, which are directed from the Office of the Chief. They are the Administrative Bureau, Field Operations Bureau, and the Investigative Bureau. Each is commanded by a deputy chief. The bureaus, in turn, are divided into nine different divisions. Four of these are geographical; the city is split into Central Patrol, Pioneer Patrol (west) and Liberty Patrol (east), and the Salt Lake City International Airport, whose police merged with the SLCPD on December 31, 2018. Staff are also allocated to the Special Operations, Investigations, Support and Professional Standards divisions.

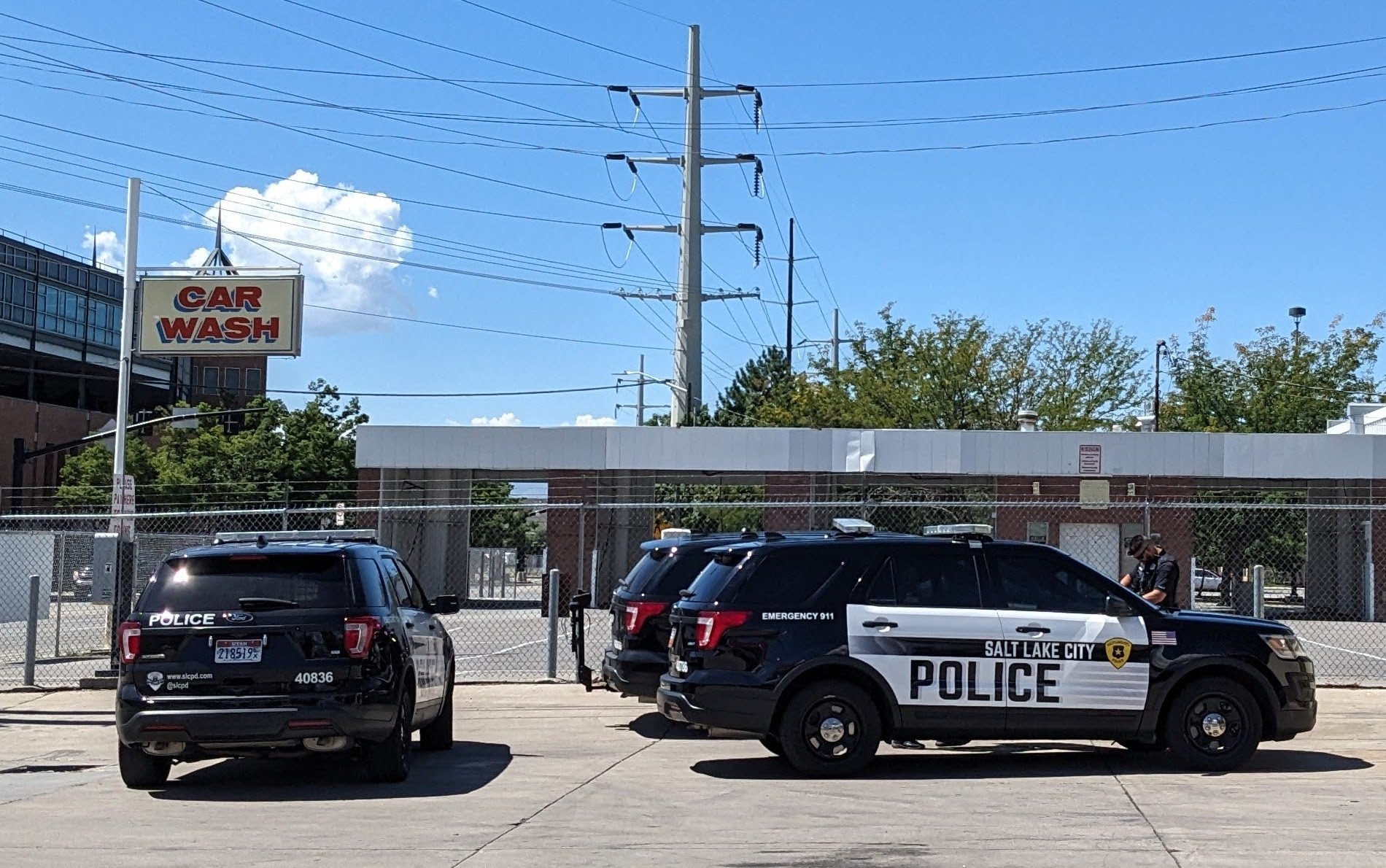
Salt Lake City Police responding to an incident in the Ballpark Neighborhood

The Salt Lake Police Association represents over 350 rank and file officers.

The association began as the Salt Lake City Police Mutual Aid Association, established in 1911. After a few iterations, in 1984, the Salt Lake Police Association was formed as an independent union, and won recognition by the City as the exclusive bargaining agent for the officers. Since 2014, the association stands with the Utah State AFL-CIO in legislative issues to preserve retirement, collective bargaining and other labor issues, although presently it is not an affiliate.

The current president is Joe McBride.

== High-profile cases ==
The SLCPD has handled several cases, most notably the Elizabeth Smart kidnapping in 2002, the murder of Lori Hacking in 2004, the kidnapping and murder of Destiny Norton in 2006, and the shooting spree at Trolley Square in 2007 that resulted in five deaths and four serious woundings. The department also took part in the Salt Lake City Public Library hostage incident in 1994.

On August 13, 2017, officer Clinton Fox fatally shot Patrick Harmon, an African American man they attempted to arrest for riding a bicycle without proper lighting.

Later that same month, footage released on August 31, 2017 show an emergency room incident between the police detective Jeff Payne and the nurse Alex Wubbels at the University of Utah Hospital. Payne asked Wubbels to provide a blood sample from an unconscious patient, and she was arrested when she refused. Payne is no longer working for the department. Wubbels was later released and no charges were brought against her. In September 2017, the Salt Lake County District Attorney's Office and Unified Police launched an independent criminal investigation into the arrest.

In 2019, the Salt Lake Police Department garnered international attention surrounding the murder of Mackenzie Lueck, a University of Utah student.

In 2020, the Salt Lake Police Department garnered controversy when an officer named Matthew Farillas non-fatally shot an unarmed autistic 13-year old boy named Linden Cameron.

In January 2022, Megan Joyce Mohn became unconscious and her heart and respiration temporarily stopped during an arrest by several Salt Lake City Police officers: Joshua Hoyle, Todd D Goodsell, Dalton Hatch, and Syedsherman Mansourbeigi. After being commanded by Officer Hoyle to "sit the fuck down," she was handcuffed, and Hoyle stated that that he "assisted[her] onto her rear on the grass." Prior to unconsciousness she refused to identify herself, and unsuccessfully requested water, to which Hoyle responded "You want water? I want your name." She "irrationally" shouted tragically prophetic statements such as claiming "they're going to kill me," and "I don't want to die," as well as screaming for help. Because of her refusal to identify herself, the officers said they needed to remove her backpack, which Mohn struggled to prevent. The officers began to cut off the backpack, which Mohn protested against, saying "it's a good backpack." One officer replied, "It was a good backpack." Mohn was put into a prone position on the ground. Officer Hoyle held her shoulders and had his knee "lightly" [according to Hoyle] placed against the middle of her back, while Officer Mansourbeigi held her legs down, preventing Mohn from kicking the officers. Officer Hoyle left to get leg manacles from his police car.

When Officer Hatch took Hoyle's place, he put Mohn in "recovery position" and noted that she had lost consciousness and her heartbeat was fading, and her eyes were dilated. She did not respond to pain. Medical help was radioed for. Shortly thereafter she stopped breathing, noticeable since breaths were visible due to the cold weather. Then her pulse was lost. Cardiac resuscitation began. Mohn remained unconscious until dying 19 days later. The cause of death was found to be oxygen loss to the brain, caused by heart stoppage, likely due to amphetamine intoxication, with the likelihood of physical restraint as an additional factor.

Afterwards, the officers involved declined to be questioned by investigators, as is their constitutional right. (The Fifth Amendment grants suspects in the United States the right to refuse to answer questions if their answers might incriminate them). The Salt Lake Tribune reported that District Attorney Sim Gill said that he was unlikely to be able to obtain a conviction against any of the officers involved, and that it would be unethical to attempt to prosecute, given the possibility of innocence. Although the physical restraint might or might not have played a role in the fatal outcome, the physical restraint was determined to be "necessary or reasonable" according to use of force consultant Eric Daigle, and "consistent with policy and training." However, the district attorney stated that it had been known that placing a suspect in a prone position can cause death. Also, the Salt Lake Tribune reported that medical consultant Mary Driscoll stated that officers have sometimes been misinformed that if a suspect can scream, then she or he can breathe. However, sometimes the lungs only contain carbon dioxide instead of oxygen when a person is screaming.

== Ranks and Insignia ==
Title	Insignia
Chief of police	
Deputy chief	
Commander	
Lieutenant	
Sergeant	
Detective	None
Police officer	None

In July or August of 2024, the rank of captain was eliminated and replaced with the rank of commander.

== See also ==
- List of law enforcement agencies in Utah
- Lester Wire
- Minneapolis Police Department
