= 2017 University of Utah Hospital incident =

Arrest of nurse by Salt Lake City police

Coordinates: 40°46′19.02″N 111°50′10.44″W

On July 26, 2017, Jeff Payne, a then detective with the Salt Lake City Police Department (SLCPD), arrested nurse Alex Wubbels at the University of Utah Hospital after she refused to illegally venipuncture an unconscious patient. Footage of the incident released on August 31, 2017, went viral online. The SLCPD announced policy changes which would affect how police should handle situations involving drawing blood, and the hospital announced it would also change its police protocol to avoid repeating the incident. Utah lawmakers made a bill to amend the blood draw policy of Utah law enforcement, which Utah Governor Gary Herbert signed into law on March 15, 2018.

== Incident ==
External videos
- Body camera footage of the arrest

On July 26, 2017, Marcos Torres, a pickup truck driver fleeing from Utah Highway Patrol troopers in Cache County, Utah, crashed head-on into a semi-truck. Torres died at the scene. William Gray, the semi-truck driver and a part-time police officer, was severely burned. He was taken into the University of Utah Hospital in a sedated and comatose state.

Officers from the Salt Lake City Police Department arrived at the hospital and asked to get a blood sample from Gray. Alex Wubbels was on-duty nurse at the time and advised Payne that the police request did not meet the legal requirements and could not be performed. Wubbels cited established policy that

1. the patient must be under arrest, or
2. a warrant must have been issued ordering the taking of a blood sample, or
3. the patient must give his or her consent.

She cited to that effect the specific hospital policy, on which the police department had agreed, that would not permit her to provide the blood sample. Payne, however, insisted he had implied consent to obtain the blood.

Wubbels is shown in the Detective Jeff Payne's body cam video holding a cell phone in her palm. On the video, Payne can be heard saying, "She [Wubbels] is the one who has told me 'no'." The remote person on that phone, assumed to be a hospital administrator, says

Yeah, sir, but you're making a big mistake. Right now you are making a huge mistake and are threatening a nurse-

Payne then cut the conversation off with an "OK" and made a two-handed grab for her phone; when she pulled it away he said, "No. We're done. We're done," and then grabbed and arrested Wubbels. She was later released after spending 20 minutes in the police car in handcuffs without any charges being brought against her.

Gray never recovered from his injuries and died on September 25, 2017.

== Investigations & response ==
At a press conference on August 31, 2017, nurse Wubbels and her attorney released footage of the incident taken from hospital surveillance and police body cameras. The footage of the incident soon went viral online. The SLCPD faced heavy criticism on social media for how it handled the incident.

Multiple news outlets reported that Detective Payne had previously been reprimanded in 2013 for sexual harassment towards a female colleague.

According to a statement posted by Salt Lake City mayor Jackie Biskupski, the SLCPD launched a 35-day internal affairs investigation into the arrest within 24 hours of the July 26 incident, starting with meeting the hospital's CEO and nursing management team. A state audit of this investigation found that the police department had followed policies for this investigation, though it suggested the SLCPD should work faster to publicize information that is in public interest. The Salt Lake County District Attorney Sim Gill announced that his office was also investigating the arrest. Gill requested investigative assistance from the Federal Bureau of Investigation (FBI). FBI spokeswoman Sandra Yi Barker said the agency opened a civil rights review after the video went public, agreed to help the county investigate the incident, and also opened a probe into the arrest. The Unified Police Department of Greater Salt Lake also investigated the arrest.

The SLCPD publicly apologized to Wubbels for the arrest, and put officer Payne on paid leave on September 1, 2017. Another police officer connected to the incident was put on paid leave the next day. According to Payne's attorney, Payne had expressed a desire to apologize to Wubbels for the incident.

On September 2, about a hundred Utahns gathered at a Utah Against Police Brutality rally near the SLCPD courtyard to call for Payne to be fired. The University of Utah police chief apologized to Wubbels on September 4, saying that the university police should have done more to protect her on the night she was arrested.

On September 13, 2017, Jackie Biskupski, the mayor of Salt Lake City, said that the internal investigation revealed Payne and his watch commander, Lt. James Tracy, violated six separate staff policies during the incident, including policies regarding arrests and standards of conduct. A report from Salt Lake City's Police Civilian Review Board also alleged that Payne and Tracy violated police policies. It stated that Payne became upset and frustrated during the incident, eventually "[losing] control of his emotions." Payne's lawyer said this report was based on speculation.

On September 25, the Salt Lake Police Association, the police union, criticized the city for its treatment of the police officers involved in the incident.

On October 11, 2017, Payne was fired by the police department and his commanding officer at the time of the incident, Lieutenant James Tracy, was demoted two ranks down to police officer. Payne had been already fired on September 5 from his part-time job as a paramedic for the private firm of Gold Cross Ambulance.

Tracy appealed his demotion, arguing it amounted to "excessive discipline," but the Salt Lake City's Civil Service Commission upheld it.

== Aftermath ==
Following the incident, the SLCPD changed its policies on drawing blood. A police department spokeswoman said these changes require law enforcement to have consent or a warrant to draw blood, instead of just implied consent. These policy changes served as the model for police protocols announced by the SLCPD on October 12, 2017, which other police agencies in the Salt Lake Valley could choose to adopt.

According to hospital officials, within weeks after the incident, they had implemented new rules meant to allow patient care staff to focus on their work and minimize disputes in patient care units. The hospital announced these changes in September 2017, which included not allowing police officers in patient-care areas and having them speak with "house supervisors" instead of nurses.

On October 31, 2017, Wubbels and her attorney announced that Salt Lake City and the University of Utah had agreed to settle the incident for $500,000. She said that part of the settlement would go toward efforts geared to making body cam footage easier for the public to obtain. She also said she will make a donation to the Utah Nurses Association and help lead the #EndNurseAbuse campaign by the American Nurses Association.

On October 11, 2019, the former detective Payne filed a suit against the Salt Lake City Police Department, seeking more than $300,000 in damages and claiming that, in 2017, though following the orders of his commanding officer and complying with department policies, he was "wrongfully terminated." Payne had been hired in August 2019 by the Weber County Sheriff's Office as a "part-time civilian corrections assistant," the "second controversial high-profile hire" for the Sheriff's Office "in recent months," as the press reported, coming a few weeks after Kayla Dallof, a former University of Utah police detective who had been fired for showing a “complete dereliction of duty,” was hired as a sheriff's deputy. The lawsuit was dismissed by agreement of both parties in January 2022 due to insufficient evidence.

== Legislative actions ==
On September 20, 2017, the Utah State Legislature's Judiciary Interim Committee voted unanimously in favor of drafting a bill that would clarify consent laws regarding police-ordered blood draws. A legislative committee then drafted a bill the following November that, mainly, would require police officers to take a blood draw only with the person's oral or written consent, through presenting a warrant, or presenting a judicially recognized exception to a warrant. Representative Craig Hall, R-West Valley City, who was a member of the drafting committee, stated that "there are situations where a blood draw is necessary and justified" but the new legislation "takes that decision out of the police officer's hands," adding that "electronic warrants take about 10 minutes to obtain, so there's really no reason not to get one."

On January 25, 2018, the Utah House of Representatives voted 72–0 to pass the bill, numbered HB43. Six days later, Alex Wubbels testified to the State's Senate Judiciary, Law Enforcement and Criminal Justice Committee in support of the bill. The Salt Lake City Police, the Utah Highway Patrol, the American Civil Liberties Union of Utah, and the Libertas Institute also expressed their support during the hearings. The Committee voted 6–0 in favor of passing the bill. Utah Governor Gary Herbert signed it on March 15, 2018, and the legislation went into effect on May 8, 2018.

== See also ==
- Birchfield v. North Dakota
- Mitchell v. Wisconsin
