= South Dakota v. Neville =

- Supreme Court of the United States

Argued December 8, 1982 Decided February 22, 1983
- Full case name: South Dakota, Petitioner v. Mason Henry Neville
- Citations: 459 U.S. 553 (more) 103 S. Ct. 916; 74 L. Ed. 2d 748; 1983 U.S. LEXIS 129

Case history
- Prior: State v. Neville, 312 N.W.2d 723 (S.D. 1981)

Holding
- A suspect's refusal to submit to a blood-alcohol test may be admitted as evidence of guilt at trial.

Court membership
- Chief Justice Warren E. Burger Associate Justices William J. Brennan Jr. · Byron White; Thurgood Marshall · Harry Blackmun; Lewis F. Powell Jr. · William Rehnquist; John P. Stevens · Sandra Day O'Connor

Case opinions
- Majority: O'Connor, joined by Burger, Brennan, White, Blackmun, Powell, Rehnquist
- Dissent: Stevens, joined by Marshall

Laws applied
- U.S. Const. amends. V, XIV

South Dakota v. Neville, 459 U.S. 553 (1983), was a United States Supreme Court case in which the Court held that prosecutors may use a suspect's refusal to submit to a blood-alcohol test as evidence of guilt and that the introduction of such evidence at trial does not violate the suspect's Fifth Amendment privilege against self incrimination.

== Background ==
In Schmerber v. California (1966), the Supreme Court held that the extraction and analysis of blood samples does not violate the Fifth Amendment privilege against self incrimination. However, in the years following Schmerber, a split of authority emerged in state courts with regard to whether the Fifth Amendment's privilege against self incrimination prohibited the use of a suspect's refusal to submit to a blood test as evidence of guilt. South Dakota, for example, passed a statute that stated a person's refusal to submit to a blood-alcohol test “may be admissible into evidence at the trial.”

=== Arrest of Mason Henry Neville ===
On the evening of July 19, 1980, Mason Henry Neville was stopped by two Madison, South Dakota police officers after they observed Neville's car drive past a stop sign without stopping. When officers asked Neville to step out of his car, he "staggered and fell against the car to support himself." After failing several field sobriety tests, officers placed Neville under arrest. Officers asked Neville if he would submit to a blood-alcohol test, but he refused, stating “I'm too drunk, I won't pass the test.”

At trial, Neville filed a motion to suppress all evidence associated with his refusal to take a blood alcohol test on the grounds that it violated his privilege against self incrimination. The Supreme Court of South Dakota agreed that admitting evidence of Neville's refusal to take the test violated his privilege against self incrimination, and state prosecutors appealed to the United States Supreme Court.

== Opinion of the Court ==
In a 7-2 opinion, the Supreme Court held that prosecutors could use a suspect's refusal to submit to a blood test as evidence of guilt, and the introduction of this evidence at trial does not violate the suspect's Fifth Amendment privilege against self incrimination. Writing for the Court's majority, Justice O'Connor concluded that "the state did not directly compel respondent to refuse the test." Additionally, Justice O'Connor wrote that a "simple blood-alcohol test is so safe, painless, and commonplace" that a suspect would not feel coerced to refuse the test.

Justice O'Connor also ruled that suspects who refuse to submit to a blood test are not entitled to Miranda warnings about the consequences of refusing the test because officers made it clear that a refusal to submit to a test may lead to "adverse consequences." Justice Stevens, joined by Justice Marshall wrote a dissenting opinion in which they argued that the Court in Schmerber intended to adopt a broad and liberal interpretation of the Fifth Amendment privilege against self incrimination.

== See also ==
- List of United States Supreme Court cases
- List of United States Supreme Court cases, volume 459
- Fifth Amendment to the United States Constitution
- Breithaupt v. Abram (1957)
- Rochin v. California (1952)
