= Alex Shaffer =

Alex Shaffer may refer to:

- Alex Shaffer (actor)
- Alex Shaffer (alpine skier)
