= Donnell Joseph Creel =

- Born: June 17, 1942 (age 84); Kansas City, Missouri, U.S.
- Education: B.A. (1964), M.A. (1966) – University of Missouri–Kansas City; Ph.D. (1969) – University of Utah
- Known for: Discovery of universal optic-nerve misrouting in albinism; Director of Clinical Electrophysiology, Moran Eye Center (1993–2022)
- Scientific career
- Fields: Neuropsychology; Ophthalmology; Visual and auditory electrophysiology; Albinism research
- Workplaces: John A. Moran Eye Center, University of Utah; Veterans Administration; National Institutes of Health
- Thesis: Crossed and uncrossed optic fiber projections in albino versus pigmented mammals (1969)

Donnell Creel is a research professor emeritus of ophthalmology at the University of Utah School of Medicine.

== Early life and education ==
Creel was born in Kansas City, Missouri, United States. He received B.A. and M.A. degrees from the University of Missouri–Kansas City and earned a Ph.D. in neuropsychology from the University of Utah in 1968.

== Career ==
Creel worked for over three decades as a Career Research Scientist in the Veterans Administration and collaborated with the National Institutes of Health. His research includes electrophysiological and anatomical studies of the visual and auditory systems, including electroretinograms, electro-oculograms, and visually evoked potentials.

He published extensively in peer-reviewed journals and contributed chapters to clinical neurology handbooks.

== Publications ==
- Creel, D. J. (1971). Visual system anomaly associated with albinism in the cat. Nature, 231: 465–466. doi:10.1038/231465a0
- Creel, D. J. (1974). Asymmetric visually evoked potentials in human albinos: evidence for visual system anomalies. Investigative Ophthalmology, 13(6): 430–440. PMID 4831697.
- Creel, D., O'Donnell Jr, F. E., & Witkop, C. J. (1978). Visual system anomalies in human ocular albinos. Science, 201(4359): 931–933. doi:10.1126/science.684419.
- Creel, D., Garber, S. R., King, R. A., & Witkop, C. J. (1980). Auditory brainstem anomalies in human albinos. Science, 207(4428): 446–448. doi:10.1126/science.7370693.
- Creel, D., Boxer, L. A., & Fauci, A. S. (1983). Visual and auditory anomalies in Chediak-Higashi syndrome. Electroencephalography and Clinical Neurophysiology, 55(3): 252–257. doi:10.1016/0013-4694(83)90202-X.
- Creel, D. J. (2019). The electrooculogram. In Levin, K. H., & Chauvel, P. (Eds.), Handbook of Clinical Neurology, Vol. 160, pp. 495–499. Elsevier.
