= University Orthopaedic Center =

- University of Utah Health Care
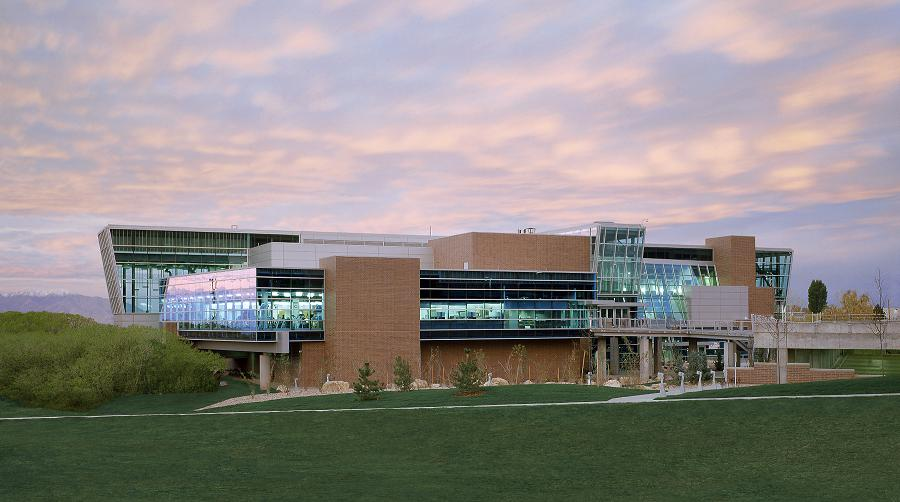

Geography
- Location: Salt Lake City, Utah, United States
- Coordinates: 40°45′23″N 111°49′59″W

Organization
- Care system: Private
- Affiliated university: University of Utah
- Patron: None

Links
- Website: http://healthcare.utah.edu/orthopaedics
- Lists: Hospitals in Utah

The University Orthopaedic Center is the only full-service specialty center of its kind in the Intermountain West of the United States, including services in joint reconstruction, sports medicine, pediatric orthopaedics, spinal disorders, hand, foot and ankle, trauma, musculoskeletal oncology, shoulder and elbow, and physical therapy.

== History ==
In 1957, Sherman S. Coleman, M.D., was appointed as head of the Division of Orthopedic Surgery at the University of Utah School of Medicine and Chief Surgeon of the then newly opened Shriners Hospital for Crippled Children. This began orthopaedics at the University of Utah School of Medicine.

Dr. Harold Dunn joined the division in 1969 with a focus on scoliosis, spine trauma, and total joint replacement. Since Coleman was well established as a pediatric orthopaedist and as a musculoskeletal oncologist, the University of Utah School of Medicine was taken in a new direction for orthopaedic care.

In 1967 the County Hospital closed, and the University of Utah Health Sciences Center opened on the main campus. It stayed there until 1981, when it moved into a new, larger, adjacent building. The clinic was moved again on October 4, 2004, when the new University Orthopaedic Center began operations with its first patients, where it currently resides.

== Medical campus ==
The University of Utah Health Sciences medical campus houses the Intermountain Burn Unit, Huntsman Cancer Institute, the Moran Eye Center, University Neuropsychiatric Institute, University of Utah Hospital, and Primary Children's Medical Center, the only children's hospital in Utah. Primary Children's Hospital, though linked to the University of Utah Health Care is owned and operated by Intermountain Health Care (Select Care).

As part of that system, University Hospitals & Clinics relies on more than 1,100 board-certified physicians, 10 community clinics, and several specialty centers, including the Cardiovascular Center, the Clinical Neurosciences Center, and the Utah Diabetes Center.
