= Huntsman Mental Health Institute =

Salt Lake City institute for psychiatric education, research, treatment

- University of Utah Health Care
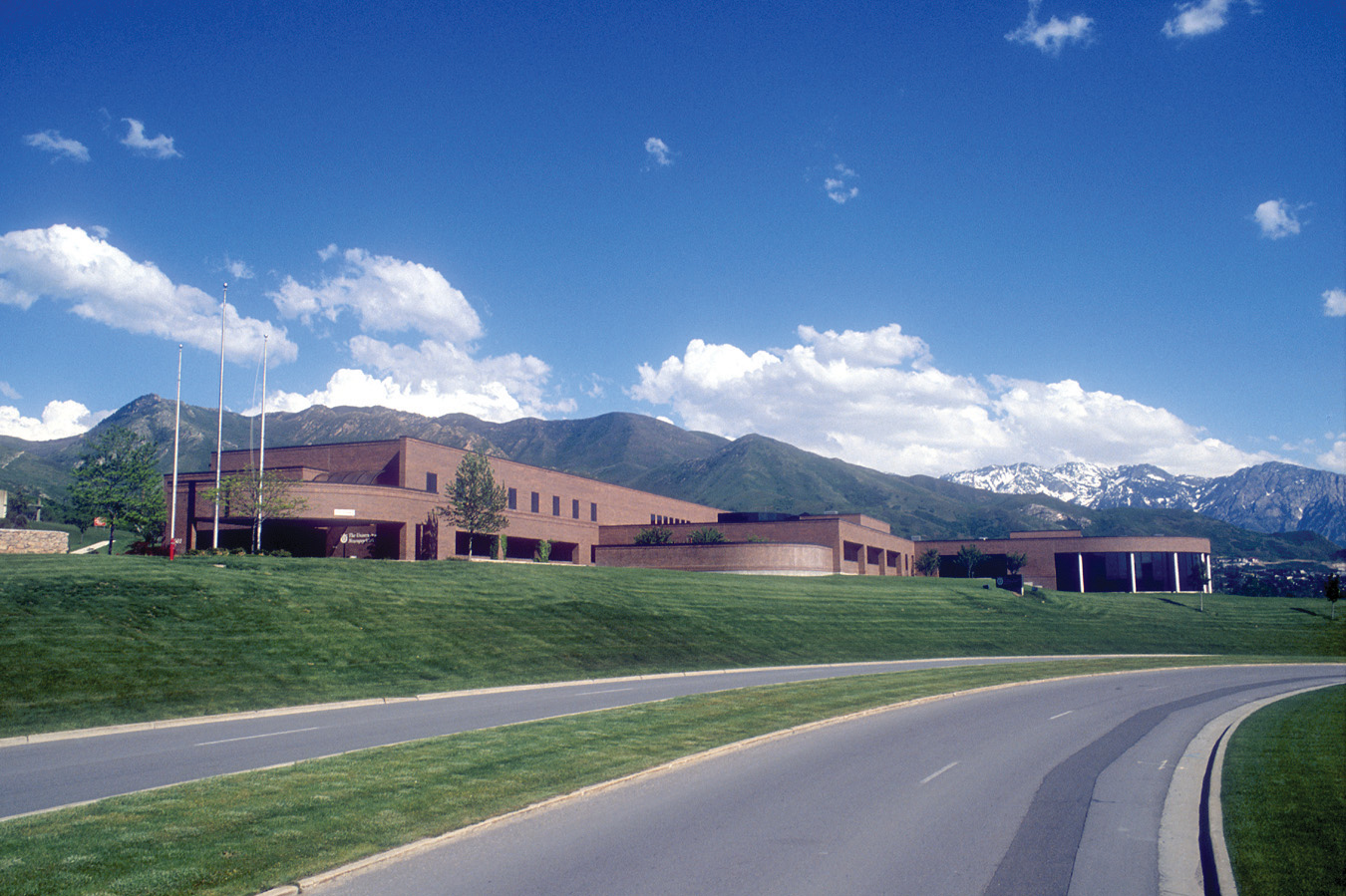

Geography
- Location: 501 Chipeta Way, Salt Lake City, Utah, United States
- Coordinates: 40°45′29″N 111°49′22″W

Organization
- Care system: Private
- Type: Specialist
- Affiliated university: University of Utah
- Patron: None

Services
- Beds: 170
- Specialty: Psychiatric hospital

History
- Founded: 1986

Links
- Website: healthcare.utah.edu/locations/hmhi/
- Lists: Hospitals in Utah

The Huntsman Mental Health Institute (HMHI), formerly University Neuropsychiatric Institute (UNI), is an assemblage of psychiatric treatment, education, and research programs based in Salt Lake City, Utah. HMHI is a component of University of Utah Health Hospitals & Clinics. The institute was dedicated on 14 January 2021 after the Huntsman family, in November 2019, committed $150 million over 10 years to create the institute

The main campus of the institute is located in the University of Utah Research Park in Salt Lake City, and includes a 170-bed psychiatric hospital for the treatment of mental disorders (including substance use disorders). The institute also provides day treatment, intensive outpatient, and regular outpatient services for children, adolescents and adults, at the main campus, and in other Salt Lake City area locations. University of Utah Health, of which Huntsman Mental Health Institute is a component, is "the only academic medical center in the state of Utah and the Mountain West", featuring a medical school and four other professional health profession schools (dentistry, nursing, pharmacy, and public health), plus several research initiatives, including neuroscience.

== History ==
Between 1988 and 1995, Dr. Jack Madsen and Dr. Rich Ferre worked to provide mental health/behavioral treatment and epilepsy under one building. Dr. Doug Gray and Dr. David Nilsen, among other doctors, became involved and the Neurobehavior Clinic began. It later moved to Research Park at the University of Utah.

In the mid-1990s, Dr. Scott Stiefel and Dr. Rick Zaharia obtained increased funding from the Division of Services for People with Disabilities (DSPD) to expand clinical services.

In 2009 HOME collaborated with the Health Clinics of Utah to expand its service locations to include Ogden.

== Medical campus ==
The University of Utah Health Sciences medical campus houses the Intermountain Burn Unit, Huntsman Cancer Institute, the Moran Eye Center, University Orthopaedic Center, University of Utah Hospital, and Primary Children's Medical Center, the only children's hospital in Utah. Primary Children's Hospital, though linked to the University of Utah Health Care is owned and operated by Intermountain Health Care (Select Care).

As part of that system, University Hospitals & Clinics relies on more than 1,100 board-certified physicians, 10 community clinics, and several specialty centers, including the Cardiovascular Center, the Clinical Neurosciences Center, and the Utah Diabetes Center.
