= Winston v. Lee =

- Supreme Court of the United States

Argued October 31, 1984 Decided March 20, 1985
- Full case name: Andrew J. Winston, Sheriff and Aubrey M. Davis, Jr. v. Rudolph Lee, Jr.
- Citations: 470 U.S. 753 (more) 105 S.Ct. 1611; 84 L. Ed. 2d 662; 1985 U.S. LEXIS 76

Case history
- Prior: Certiorari to the United States Court of Appeals for the Fourth Circuit

Holding
- A compelled surgical intrusion into an individual's body for evidence implicates expectations of privacy and security of such magnitude that the intrusion would be "unreasonable" under the Fourth Amendment.

Court membership
- Chief Justice Warren E. Burger Associate Justices William J. Brennan Jr. · Byron White; Thurgood Marshall · Harry Blackmun; Lewis F. Powell Jr. · William Rehnquist; John P. Stevens · Sandra Day O'Connor

Case opinions
- Majority: Brennan, joined by Burger, White, Marshall, Powell, Stevens, O'Connor
- Concurrence: Burger
- Concurrence: Blackmun, Rehnquist (in the judgment)

Laws applied
- U.S. Const. amend. IV

Winston v. Lee, 470 U.S. 753 (1985), was a decision by the U.S. Supreme Court, which held that a compelled surgical intrusion into an individual's body for evidence implicates expectations of privacy and security of such magnitude that the intrusion would be "unreasonable" under the Fourth Amendment, even if likely to produce evidence of a crime.

The reasonableness of surgical intrusions beneath the skin depends on a case-by-case approach, in which the individual's interests in privacy and security are weighed against society's interests in conducting the procedure to obtain evidence for fairly determining guilt or innocence. The appropriate framework of analysis for such cases is provided in Schmerber v. California (1966), which held that a State may, over the suspect's protest, have a physician extract blood from a person suspected of drunken driving without violating the suspect's Fourth Amendment rights.

== Background ==
A shopkeeper, Ralph Watkinson was wounded by gunshot during an attempted robbery but, also being armed with a gun, apparently wounded his assailant in his left side, and the assailant then ran from the scene. Shortly after Watkinson was taken to a hospital, police officers found Rudolph Lee, who was suffering from a gunshot wound to his left chest area, eight blocks away from the shooting. He was also taken to the hospital, where Watkinson identified him as the robber.

After an investigation, the police charged Lee with, among other things, attempted robbery, and malicious wounding. Thereafter, the Commonwealth of Virginia moved in state court for an order directing Lee to undergo surgery to remove a bullet lodged under his left collarbone, asserting that the bullet would provide evidence of Lee's guilt or innocence. However, Lee expressed resistance toward this procedure. On the basis of expert testimony that the surgery would require an incision of only about one-half inch, could be performed under local anesthesia, and would result in "no danger on the basis that there's no general anesthesia employed," the court granted that the surgery could proceed, and the Virginia Supreme Court denied Lee's petition for a writ of prohibition and/or a writ of habeas corpus.

Lee subsequently brought an action in Federal District Court to prevent the pending operation, claiming that it constituted an "illegal search" on Fourth Amendment grounds, but the court refused to issue a preliminary injunction. Shortly thereafter, X-rays taken just before surgery was scheduled to begin showed that the bullet was lodged substantially deeper than had been thought when the state court initially granted the motion to compel surgery, and the surgeon concluded that a general anesthetic would be desirable. Armed with this information, Lee unsuccessfully sought a rehearing in the state trial court, and the Virginia Supreme Court affirmed. However, Lee then returned to the Federal District Court, which, after an evidentiary hearing, ruled against enforcing the surgery, a ruling which the Court of Appeals affirmed.

== Opinion of the Court ==
The Supreme Court was unanimous in determining that, in the absence of any potentially substantial evidentiary gains from performing such an operation, the surgery did indeed constitute an "unreasonable search" under the Fourth Amendment. According to the opinion authored by William J. Brennan Jr., since the Commonwealth of Virginia could not produce a compelling argument that recovering the bullet from Lee would provide significant evidence in the case, the surgery was unconstitutional. However, Chief Justice Warren E. Burger wrote in his concurring opinion that this motion did not necessarily preclude officers from detaining an individual whose body/presence could naturally provide evidence in a case.

== See also ==
- List of United States Supreme Court cases, volume 470
- Union Pacific Railway Co. v. Botsford (1891), same principle in civil case
- Rochin v. California (1952)
- Breithaupt v. Abram (1957)
- Schmerber v. California (1966)
