= Missouri v. McNeely =

- Supreme Court of the United States

Argued January 9, 2013 Decided April 17, 2013
- Full case name: State of Missouri v. Tyler Gabriel McNeely
- Citations: 569 U.S. 141 (more) 133 S. Ct. 1552; 185 L. Ed. 2d 696; 2013 U.S. LEXIS 3160; 81 U.S.L.W. 4250
- Opinion announcement: Opinion announcement

Case history
- Prior: motion to suppress evidence granted, unreported No. 10CG-CR01849-01 (Cir. Ct. Cape Girardeau Cty., Mo., Div. II, Mar. 3, 2011); case referred to higher court, 2011 WL 2455571 (Mo.App. E.D.); motion affirmed, 358 S.W.3d 65 (Mo. 2012); rehearing denied, unreported (Mo. March 6, 2012); cert. granted, 567 U.S. 968 (2012).

Holding
- The fact that blood-alcohol levels dissipate after drinking ceases, is not a per se exigency pursuant to Schmerber justifying an officer to order a blood test without obtaining a warrant from a neutral judge.

Court membership
- Chief Justice John Roberts Associate Justices Antonin Scalia · Anthony Kennedy; Clarence Thomas · Ruth Bader Ginsburg; Stephen Breyer · Samuel Alito; Sonia Sotomayor · Elena Kagan

Case opinions
- Majority: Sotomayor, joined by Scalia, Kennedy, Ginsburg, Kagan (Parts I, II–A, II–B, and IV)
- Plurality: Sotomayor, joined by Scalia, Ginsburg, Kagan (Parts II–C and III)
- Concurrence: Kennedy (in part)
- Concur/dissent: Roberts, joined by Breyer, Alito
- Dissent: Thomas

Laws applied
- U.S. Const. Amend. IV

Missouri v. McNeely, 569 U.S. 141 (2013), was a case decided by United States Supreme Court, on appeal from the Supreme Court of Missouri, regarding exceptions to the Fourth Amendment to the United States Constitution under exigent circumstances. The United States Supreme Court ruled that police must generally obtain a warrant before subjecting a drunken-driving suspect to a blood test, and that the natural metabolism of blood alcohol does not establish a per se exigency that would justify a blood draw without consent.

== Background ==
At approximately 2:08 a.m. on October 3, 2010, Tyler McNeely was stopped after a highway patrol officer observed him exceed the posted speed limit, and cross over the centerline. The officer reportedly noticed signs of intoxication from McNeely, including bloodshot eyes, slurred speech, and the smell of alcohol on his breath. McNeely failed field-sobriety tests administered by the officer. After refusing to blow into a handheld breathalyzer, and stating that he would refuse a breathalyzer at the police station, the officer drove McNeely directly to a medical center instead of the station. The officer did not seek a warrant to conduct the blood test, but asked McNeely for his consent. McNeely was warned by the officer that by refusing a chemical test, his license would be revoked for one year. McNeely continued to refuse, and at 2:35 a.m., the officer proceeded to instruct the lab technician to draw a specimen of blood from McNeely. The results of the blood test showed a BAC of 0.154 percent, which was above the state's legal limit of 0.08 percent. McNeely was charged with driving while intoxicated, and later moved to suppress the results of his blood test, as he argued that it was done unconstitutionally as an unreasonable search and seizure.

== Procedural history ==
A trial judge sided with McNeely, ruling in his favor by suppressing the results of the blood test. The judge emphasized that conducting a blood test without a warrant constituted a breach of the suspect's Fourth Amendment protection against unreasonable searches and seizures.

Later, state prosecutors argued that justifying the administration of the test without a warrant was valid because blood alcohol would metabolize with time, and a delay in obtaining a warrant would amount to destruction of evidence, citing the exigent circumstances exception in the 1966 United States Supreme Court decision Schmerber v. California. On appeal, the state appeals court stated an intention to reverse, but transferred the case directly to the Missouri Supreme Court. The Missouri Supreme Court affirmed the trial court's decision that the officer had violated McNeely's Fourth Amendment rights. The United States Supreme Court granted a petition for writ of certiorari on 25 September 2012.

== Opinion of the Court ==
A 5-4 Supreme Court affirmed the Missouri Supreme Court, agreeing that an involuntary blood draw is a "search" as that term is used in the Fourth Amendment. As such, a warrant is generally required. In its majority opinion, the Court found that because McNeely's "case was unquestionably a routine DWI case" in which no factors other than the natural dissipation of blood-alcohol suggested that there was an emergency, the court held that the nonconsensual warrantless blood draw violated McNeely's Fourth Amendment right to be free from unreasonable searches of his person. However, the Court left open the possibility that the "exigent circumstances" exception to that general requirement might apply in some drunk-driving cases.

== See also ==
- Breithaupt v. Abram (1957) U.S. Supreme Court case in which the Court ruled that involuntary blood samples, taken by a skilled technician to determine intoxication, do not violate substantive due process under the Fourteenth Amendment
- Birchfield v. North Dakota (2016) A warrantless breath test, on the other hand, is constitutional.
- Mitchell v. Wisconsin (2019) U.S. Supreme Court case in which the Court ruled that in the event a driver is unconscious and therefore can't be given a breath test as an alternative to testing blood, exigent circumstances allow for the drawing of blood without a warrant.
