= Implied consent =

Legal concept in United States law

Implied consent is consent which is not expressly granted by a person, but rather implicitly granted by a person's actions and the facts and circumstances of a particular situation (or in some cases, by a person's silence or inaction). For example, if a person is unconscious as a result of injuries sustained during a traffic collision, medical treatment may be provided to that person, despite the unconscious person being unable to expressly grant consent for that treatment.

== Driving while intoxicated ==
All U.S. states have driver licensing laws which state that a licensed driver has given their implied consent to a certified breathalyzer or by a blood sample by their choice, or similar manner of determining blood alcohol concentration. Implied consent laws may result in punishment for those who refuse to cooperate with blood alcohol testing after an arrest for suspected impaired driving, including civil consequences such as a driver's license suspension.

In 2016, the Supreme Court of the United States in Birchfield v. North Dakota held that both breath tests and blood tests constitute a search under the Fourth Amendment, concluding that requiring breath tests is constitutional without a search warrant, however, requiring more intrusive blood tests involving piercing the skin is not, as the goal of traffic safety can be obtained by less invasive means. Specifically addressing implied consent laws, the court in the Birchfield opinion stated that while their "prior opinions have referred approvingly to the general concept of implied-consent laws" that "there must be a limit to the consequences to which motorists may be deemed to have consented by virtue of a decision to drive on public roads" and "that motorists could be deemed to have consented to only those conditions that are 'reasonable' in that they have a 'nexus' to the privilege of driving".

In 2016, People v. Arredondo, the California Courts of appeals debated whether authorities could seize an unwarranted blood sample from an unconscious person suspected of driving under the influence without offending the Fourth Amendment's guarantee against unreasonable searches or seizures. The court ruled that the defendant "consented to such a search in advance solely by operation of the statute in California, which declares that anyone who drives a vehicle in this state is "deemed to have given his or her consent" to blood alcohol testing under specified conditions. Though Arredondo was unconscious at the time his blood was drawn, the court found that the "warrantless search was justified on the consent since California's "implied consent" law states "one who drives a motor vehicle in this state is 'deemed' to consent to blood alcohol testing". Moreover, the court ruled that the extraction was justified by "exigent circumstances, statutorily implied consent, the officer's belief that the extraction was lawful in light of long-standing practice under prior case law and good faith reliance on the implied consent statute".

In 1966, the Supreme Court of the United States in Schmerber v. California held that a warrantless blood sample is justified under the Fourth Amendment's pressing circumstances because alcohol in one's blood would be diminished by the body's natural metabolic system if officers were to wait for a warrant. The Fifth Amendment only applies to interrogation and testimony and does not prohibit blood tests. The case resulted in a conviction because it was decided that blood test results do not constitute testimony, proof of a confession or any other communicative acts.

=== Non-evidential testing ===
In the United States, implied consent laws generally do not apply to Preliminary Breath Test (PBT) testing (small handheld devices, as opposed to evidential breath test devices). For a handheld field breath tester to be used as evidential breath testing, the device must be properly certified and calibrated, evidential procedures must be followed, and it may be necessary to administer an "implied consent" warning to the suspect prior to testing.

In most US jurisdictions, participation in a PBT test is voluntary; however for some violations, such as refusals by commercial drivers or by drivers under 21 years of age, some US jurisdictions may impose implied consent consequences for a PBT refusal. For example, the state of Michigan has a roadside PBT law that requires a motorist provide a preliminary breath test; however, for non-commercial drivers Michigan's penalties are limited to a "civil infraction" penalty, with no violation "points".

Participation in "field sobriety tests" (FSTs or SFSTs) is voluntary in the US.

== Sexual assault ==
In Canada, implied consent has not been a defence for sexual assault since the 1999 Supreme Court of Canada case of R v Ewanchuk, where the court unanimously ruled that consent has to be explicit, instead of merely "implied".

In the United States, rape has traditionally been defined as the victim's nonconsent to sexual intercourse. However, "the law of rape is founded on a paradigm of violent stranger rape which fails to clearly proscribe less violent rapes." This ambiguity requires the courts to determine whether the victim consented or not. During this process it is possible that, "courts examine objective evidence of the woman's state of mind, such as her behavior during the alleged rape and her character in general." This would allow the defense a chance to convince the court that consent was in some way implied by the victim. Many actions can be perceived by the court as implied consent: having a previous relationship with the alleged rapist (e.g. befriending, dating, cohabitating, or marrying), consenting to sexual contact on previous occasions, flirting, wearing provocative clothing, etc. These actions are not explicitly defined by the law as indicators of consent; however, the court may come to the conclusion that these actions in some way implied consent, as has often been the result in non-stranger rape cases. Implied consent may also be used as a defense in the case of violent stranger rape.

Common law rape has generally been defined as "the act of a man having unlawful carnal knowledge of a female over the age of ten years by force without the consent and against the will of the victim." While force is a key element of rape, the evidence must conclude that either the victim resisted and their resistance was overcome by force, or that they were prevented from resisting because their safety was threatened. However, since resistance is relevant to crimes of sexual assault, the presence or absence of it depends on the facts and circumstances in each case. While consent may involve submission, submission itself does not necessarily imply consent. In other words, "submission to a compelling force, or as a result of being put in fear, is not consent" since it has been proven that non-resistance or compliance with an attacker's request is a way to protect oneself from additional and often more severe abuse. "Genuine and continuing fear of such harm", or abuse, "on the part of the persecuting witness" is a significant factor in determining whether the attacker committed a "felonious and forcible act against the will and consent of the prosecuting witness". As a tactic for survival, rape counselors advise women to "do whatever is necessary to protect themselves from physical injury and to save their lives" in a threatening situation.

=== Spousal rape ===
In many common law jurisdictions, a couple who married were deemed to have given "implied consent" to have sex with each other, a doctrine which barred prosecution of a spouse for rape. This doctrine is now considered obsolete in Western countries.

In the United States, however, some state legislatures offer leniency to perpetrators of spousal rape. These laws typically require the use of physical violence from the perpetrator in order to be considered a felony. Reasons given relate to evidence and the potential for malicious prosecution.

In the 1984 Virginia Supreme Court case Weishaupt v. Commonwealth, it states that "[A] wife can unilaterally revoke her implied consent to marital sex where ... *292 she has made manifest her intent to terminate the marital relationship by living separate and apart from her husband; refraining from voluntary sexual intercourse with her husband; and, in light of all the circumstances, conducting herself in a manner that establishes a de facto end to the marriage." This allows the spouse to commit what would be considered rape outside of marriage, inside the confines of the marriage as long as the de facto end of the marriage has not occurred. The Virginia Supreme Court upheld the ruling in 1984 Kizer v. Commonwealth.

Idaho State legislature states, "No person shall be convicted of rape for any act or acts with that person's spouse..." unless the perpetrator used physical violence. Similar to Idaho, South Carolina State legislature only considers spousal sexual battery as a felony if "accomplished through use of aggravated force."

Oklahoma State Law, being one of the more extreme examples, excludes spousal rape from their definition of rape by claiming, "Rape is an act of sexual intercourse involving vaginal or anal penetration accomplished with a male or female who is not the spouse of the perpetrator..."

Commonwealth v. Chretien in Massachusetts in 1981 stated that, "There was no unfairness in subjecting a defendant to criminal prosecution for rape of his wife under G. L. c. 265, Section 22, as amended by St. 1974, c. 474, Section 1, which this court construes to eliminate the common law spousal exclusion, where the rape occurred after the wife had obtained a judgment of divorce nisi and was therefore unlawful even under the common law." They concluded that the husband could be convicted of rape only because the wife had already ordered divorce papers.

Some states however do not offer leniency to perpetrators of spousal rape.

In State v. Smith 1981 in New Jersey one of the concurring opinions states, "The statute has never contained any exception or exemption. I would construe it to mean exactly what it says and would hold that a husband who had carnal knowledge of his wife forcibly and against her will was guilty of rape." This case affirmed that rape can still take place while a marriage is still ongoing.

Similarly in People vs. Liberta 1984 in New York, the opinion states about the Marriage Exception, "This statement is an apt characterization of the marital exemption; it lacks a rational basis, and therefore violates the equal protection clauses of both the Federal and State Constitutions".

== Medical care ==
=== First aid ===
In the United States, if a person is at risk of death or injury but unconscious or otherwise unable to respond, other people including members of the public and paramedics may assume implied consent to touch the person to provide first aid. Many states have Good Samaritan laws that protect persons giving aid from legal liability, but the type of persons (laypeople versus healthcare professionals) and the amount of protection varies.

=== Reproductive healthcare ===
Studies have indicated that implied consent is questionable due to the value patients place on being informed on even the simplest procedures being done to them. There are varying events where implied consent can be seen in reproductive healthcare. An example of implied consent being utilized is when complication arise during routine childbirth and actions need to be taken in order to help the mother and fetus. If complications arise during a natural delivery, an emergency cesarean delivery may be performed, even if the mother had previously rejected the option. However this can only occur if the life of the mother or fetus is in danger.

Implied consent is narrow in that "intervention must be necessary, not merely convenient." Implied consent in law indicates that "medical necessity requires a genuine perception of emergency, and a reasonable response." Some doctors have tried to claim implied consent in the sterilization of women belonging to ethnic minority groups in Europe. This then led to the formation of laws concerning human rights by international treaties and national legislatures that state consent must be given freely by the person in regards to their sterilization.

=== Post-mortem organ removal ===
Some countries have legislation allowing for implied consent for post-mortem organ removal, asking people to opt out instead of opting in, but allow family refusals.

== Court procedure ==
Typically, a party has the right to object in court to a line of questioning or at the introduction of a particular piece of evidence. A party who fails to object in a timely fashion is deemed to have waived their right to object and cannot raise the objection on appeal. That is a form of implied consent.

In California, "Any person providing the [California Department of Motor Vehicles] with a mailing address shall... consent to receive service of process...."

== See also ==
- Tacit assumption
