= Alex Wubbels =

American nurse and former Olympian (born 1976)

- Born: Alexandra Luise Shaffer; January 23, 1976 (age 50); Aspen, Colorado, U.S.
- Occupation: Nurse
- Known for: Olympic skier, Arrested for obstructing unlawful police procedures, later released without charge (July 2017)
- Spouse: Cory Wubbels (m. 2014)

Alexandra Luise Wubbels (née Shaffer; born January 23, 1976) is an American nurse and former Olympian. As an alpine ski competitor, she was the national champion in both the slalom and giant slalom in 1999, and competed in the 1998 and 2002 Winter Olympics as Alex Shaffer.

In July 2017, she was involved in an incident where police attempted to unlawfully obtain blood from an unconscious patient in her care.

== Early life ==
Wubbels graduated from Salt Lake City's non-profit, Rowland K-12 school in 1994, participating in the Rowmark Ski Academy. She earned a nursing degree from the University of Utah.

== Career ==
=== Olympic skier ===
Alex Wubbels
Medal record

Women's alpine skiing

United States Alpine Championship
Gold medal – first place	1999 Park City	Giant slalom
Gold medal – first place	1999 Park City	Slalom

Competing in the alpine skiing events at the 1998 Winter Olympics held in Nagano, Japan, Alex Shaffer finished 9th in the women's combined and did not finish in the women's giant slalom. She also competed in the Alpine skiing events at the 2002 Winter Olympics held in Salt Lake City, Utah, where she finished 28th in the women's giant slalom.

=== Nurse ===
According to Wubbels, a sports psychologist encouraged her to go into nursing after matching her personality with the profession. Wubbels began working as a nurse at the University of Utah Hospital in Salt Lake City in 2009.

On July 26, 2017, she was unlawfully arrested for "obstructing justice" while on duty as a nurse at the University of Utah Hospital in Salt Lake City. The incident was later made public via the officers' body cameras. The arresting officer, detective Jeff Payne of the Salt Lake City Police Department, demanded that blood be drawn from an unconscious patient, but Wubbels stated that doing so would be a violation of hospital policy, which required that the patient be under arrest, or had given consent, or that the police were in possession of a warrant (either a printed copy or an electronic one). The patient was the victim in a car crash and was not under arrest, but was unconscious and therefore unable to consent, and the police had not obtained a warrant. She followed hospital policy and refused to allow the officer to draw blood, and the arresting officers proceeded to forcibly put her in handcuffs and into the front passenger seat of their cruiser. The year-old hospital policy related to blood draws reflects the legal position in the Health Insurance Portability and Accountability Act (HIPAA), as well as the Supreme Court of the United States' ruling in Birchfield v. North Dakota and had been agreed to by the police department.

Wubbels was later released without charge. The arresting officer was fired on October 10, and his supervisor James Tracy was demoted two ranks from Lieutenant to Officer. On October 31, 2017, Wubbels and her attorney announced that Salt Lake City and the University of Utah had agreed to settle the incident for $500,000. She said that part of her settlement will go toward efforts geared to making body cam footage more accessible to the public. The incident was one of the reasons Medscape put Wubbels on its list of the best physicians in 2017.

== Personal life ==
In June 2014 Shaffer married fellow skier Cory Wubbels. He is a former All-American Nordic skier who competed for Northern Michigan University and is a guitar player, carpenter and master ski technician. They had their first child in December 2014.
