= Breithaupt v. Abram =

- Supreme Court of the United States

Argued December 12–13, 1956 Decided February 25, 1957
- Full case name: Paul H. Breithaupt, Petitioner v. Morris Abram, Warden
- Citations: 352 U.S. 432 (more) 77 S. Ct. 408; 1 L. Ed. 2d 448

Case history
- Prior: Certiorari to the Supreme Court of New Mexico, Breithaupt v. Abram, 58 N.M. 385 (1954).

Holding
- Involuntary blood samples, taken by a skilled technician to determine intoxication, do not violate substantive due process.

Court membership
- Chief Justice Earl Warren Associate Justices Hugo Black · Felix Frankfurter; William O. Douglas · Harold H. Burton; Tom C. Clark · John M. Harlan II

Case opinions
- Majority: Clark, joined by Reed, Frankfurter, Burton, Harlan, Brennan
- Dissent: Warren, joined by Black, Douglas
- Dissent: Douglas, joined by Black

Laws applied
- U.S. Const. amend. XIV

Breithaupt v. Abram, 352 U.S. 432 (1957), was a United States Supreme Court case in which the Court ruled that involuntary blood samples, taken by a skilled technician to determine intoxication, do not violate substantive due process under the Fourteenth Amendment of the United States Constitution. This case was only the second time the Court considered whether police could forcibly enter inside a suspect's body to extract evidence. Writing for a 6–3 majority, Justice Tom C. Clark argued that blood tests were necessary as a matter of public policy to ensure traffic safety on roads and highways, and that "modern community living requires modern scientific methods of crime detection." Chief Justice Earl Warren and Justice William O. Douglas both wrote dissenting opinions in which they argued that the involuntary blood sample taken in this case was "repulsive" and violated substantive due process.

== Background ==
=== The constitutionality of searches inside the body ===
In the 1950s the Supreme Court of the United States addressed for the first time whether the constitution permits law enforcement to forcibly extract evidence from inside the human body. The first case to address this question, Rochin v. California, set strict limits on the power of police to remove evidence from inside the human body. In Rochin, police officers broke into the home of an individual who was suspected of selling narcotics and observed him place several small capsules into his mouth. After a brief struggle, officers attempted to force open the suspect's mouth, but were unable to retrieve the capsules. Officers then handcuffed the suspect and transported him to a local hospital, where "a doctor forced an emetic solution through a tube into Rochin's stomach against his will." Through this stomach pumping, officers discovered two capsules containing morphine. In a unanimous decision, the United States Supreme Court held the forced stomach pumping violated the suspect's Fourteenth Amendment rights to substantive due process. Writing for the majority, Justice Felix Frankfurter stated:

[W]e are compelled to conclude that the proceedings by which this conviction was obtained do more than offend some fastidious squeamishness or private sentimentalism about combatting crime too energetically. This is conduct that shocks the conscience. Illegally breaking into the privacy of the petitioner, the struggle to open his mouth and remove what was there, the forcible extraction of his stomach's contents — this course of proceeding by agents of government to obtain evidence is bound to offend even hardened sensibilities. They are methods too close to the rack and the screw to permit of constitutional differentiation.

Although the Court held that evidence obtained in violation of substantive due process must be excluded in criminal prosecutions, the court declined to incorporate a broad exclusionary rule for all constitutional violations. Likewise, the Court left unanswered the question of whether evidence obtained through involuntary blood samples violates the Fifth Amendment's privilege against self incrimination.

=== Arrest and prosecution of Paul Breithaupt ===
In 1951, a truck driven by Paul Breithaupt collided with another vehicle while driving on a highway near Carlsbad, New Mexico. Three passengers in Breithaupt's truck were killed, and Breithaupt was taken to a local hospital to treat serious injuries. Responding officers found a nearly empty one-pint bottle of whiskey in the truck's glove compartment. While Breithaupt lay unconscious in the emergency room, officers ordered physicians to take a sample of his blood. A chemical analysis of this blood sample determined that Breithaupt was under the influence of alcohol when the sample was taken. This blood sample was admitted into evidence at trial, and Breithaupt was ultimately convicted of involuntary manslaughter. Breithaupt filed a petition for a writ of habeas corpus to the Supreme Court of New Mexico, but the state supreme court denied relief. He then filed an appeal with the Supreme Court of the United States, claiming the taking of the blood sample violated his rights to substantive due process. On April 23, 1956, the Supreme Court granted Breithaupt's petition for certiorari.

== Opinion of the Court ==
"The increasing slaughter on our highways, most of which should be avoidable, now reaches the astounding figures only heard of on the battlefield."

— Justice Tom C. Clark, writing for the majority of the Court

Writing for the Court's majority, Justice Tom C. Clark distinguished the facts of this case from the events that occurred in Rochin v. California. Because the blood sample in this case was taken "under the protective eye of a physician," there was nothing "brutal" or "offensive" about the extraction. Additionally, Justice Clark concluded that the absence of conscious consent "does not necessarily render the taking a violation of a constitutional right. Rather, courts should look to community standards of fairness and decency when evaluating constitutional violations:

[D]ue process is not measured by the yardstick of personal reaction or the sphygmogram of the most sensitive person, but by that whole community sense of ‘decency and fairness' that has been woven by common experience into the fabric of acceptable conduct.

Because blood tests were "routine in our everyday life," Justice Clark argued that "a blood test taken by a skilled technician" does not "shock the conscience" or offend an ordinary "sense of justice." However, Justice Clark also cautioned in dicta that "indiscriminate taking of blood under different conditions or by those not competent to do so" may rise to the level of "brutality" set forth in Rochin. If law enforcement and physicians do not provide "every proper medical precaution" to the accused, the extraction may violate the constitution. Additionally, as a matter of public policy, Justice Clark argued that "modern community living requires modern scientific methods of crime detection" and blood tests were necessary to keep the roads safe. Justice Clark also declined to incorporate the Fourth Amendment protection against warrantless searches or the Fifth Amendment privilege against self incrimination to the states.

=== Chief Justice Warren's dissenting opinion ===
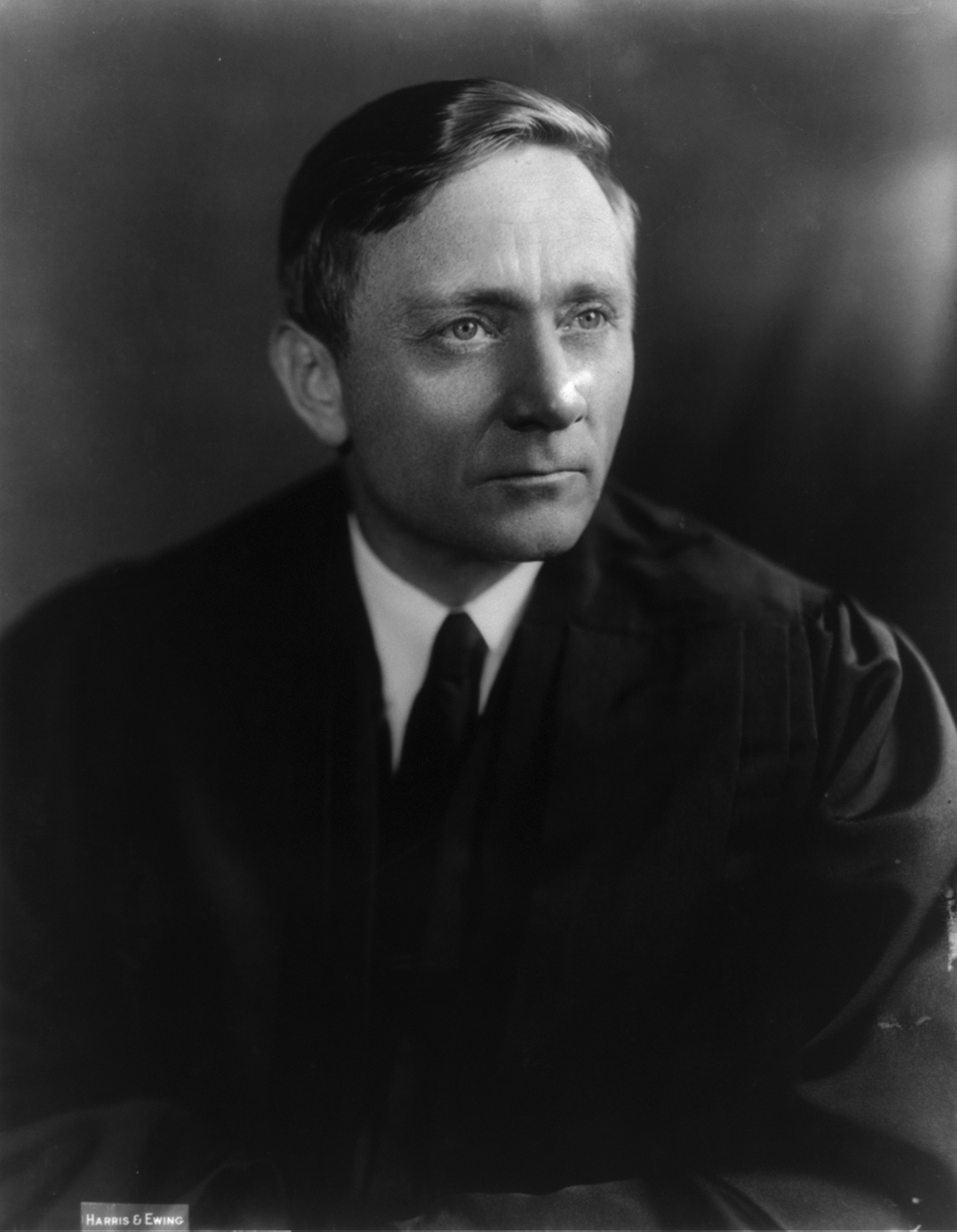
In his dissenting opinion, Justice William O. Douglas argued for an expansive interpretation of the right against self incrimination, and that "under our system of government, police cannot compel people to furnish the evidence necessary to send them to prison."

Chief Justice Earl Warren wrote a dissenting opinion in which he argued that the facts of this case were analogous to those in Rochin, and that the blood test in this case violated Breithaupt's rights to substantive due process. He criticized Justice Clark's majority opinion for relying on policy arguments about highway safety to distinguish Rochin, and that narcotics enforcement "is surely a state interest of at least as great magnitude as the interest in highway law enforcement." Chief Justice Warren also criticized Justice Clark's reliance on common standards of decency and the commonplace nature of blood tests, and instead urged the Court to hold that "bruishing the body, breaking skin, puncturing tissue or extracting body fluids" always constitute a due process violation when police collect evidence.

=== Justice Douglas' dissenting opinion ===
Justice William O. Douglas also wrote a dissenting opinion in which he noted that the court had set aside convictions in the past when the police engaged in subtle, non-violent manipulation, and that the Court should "take the same libertarian approach here." He also agreed that this case was indistinguishable from Rochin and it was "repulsive" for officers to stick a needle in the arm of an unconscious person. Justice Douglas also advocated for an expansive interpretation of the right against self incrimination, and that "under our system of government, police cannot compel people to furnish the evidence necessary to send them to prison."

== Subsequent developments ==
Although the Court declined to incorporate the Fourth Amendment's exclusionary rule or the Fifth Amendment's privilege against self incrimination in Breithaupt, the Court ultimately incorporated both of these rights to the states in 1964 and 1965. Nine years after Breithaupt, the Court granted review in Schmerber v. California to clarify whether admitting involuntary blood samples into evidence in a criminal prosecution violated Fourth Amendment protections against unreasonable searches and seizures or the Fifth Amendment privilege against self incrimination. In a 5-4 opinion, Justice William J. Brennan, Jr. held that blood samples do not implicate the right against self incrimination because the extraction and chemical analysis of blood samples do not involve "even a shadow of testimonial compulsion." However, Justice Brennan also ruled that ordinarily, search warrants are required "where intrusions into the human body are concerned."

In 1985, the Supreme Court again revisited the topic of involuntary bodily intrusions in Winston v. Lee, when the Court held that the State of Virginia could not force an individual to undergo surgery to extract a bullet that may be evidence of a crime. The Court did not explicitly evaluate whether the surgery would violate substantive due process, but the Court applied Schmerber to conclude that the surgery would constitute an unreasonable search under the Fourth Amendment.

== See also ==
- List of United States Supreme Court cases, volume 352
- Missouri v. McNeely (2013)
- Winston v. Lee (1985)
- Schmerber v. California (1966)
- Rochin v. California (1952)
