= Murder of Mackenzie Lueck =

2019 killing in Salt Lake City, Utah, USA

- Mackenzie Lueck
- Location: Salt Lake City, Utah, U.S.
- Date: June 17, 2019
- Perpetrator: Ayoola Ajayi
- Charges: Aggravated murder, aggravated kidnapping, obstruction of justice, and desecration of a body

The murder of Mackenzie Lueck occurred on June 17, 2019. Lueck, a 23-year-old student at the University of Utah and self-proclaimed "sugar baby", was reported missing and her bound, burned, and buried remains were later discovered. Ayoola Ajayi, 31, was arrested and charged with Lueck's kidnapping and murder. In October 2020, Ajayi pleaded guilty to Lueck's murder and was subsequently sentenced to life in prison without parole.

== Mackenzie Lueck ==
Mackenzie Speth Lueck was born on March 8, 1996, and raised in the city of El Segundo in Los Angeles County, along with one older brother and two younger brothers. She attended El Segundo High School where she was on the swimming team and played water polo. She then attended the University of Utah where she majored in kinesiology and pre-nursing and was a member of the Alpha Chi Omega sorority. Lueck worked at a Salt Lake City biological testing company and planned to have a career in health sciences, speaking to advisors about going to nursing or medical school. Lueck planned on graduating in May 2020. Lueck was raised in the Church of Jesus Christ of Latter-day Saints. Lueck worked as a "sugar baby" months prior to her murder, offering advice to aspiring sugar babies on using apps like Tinder to find sugar daddies as well. She boasted about having at least two such arrangements at the time.

== Ayoola Ajayi ==
Originally from Nigeria, Ayoola Ajayi was born in 1988. He held a green card that allowed him to work in the US. He formerly studied at Utah State University but was barred from campus in 2012 for several reasons, including problems with his visa and allegations that he had stolen an iPad. Ajayi was allowed to return to campus in 2015 after resolving issues with his visa. He studied computer science but did not graduate. Ajayi was an information technology worker and was briefly in the Army National Guard. According to prosecutors, he and Lueck met in 2018 on a dating website called Seeking Arrangement, which represents itself as a platform for "sugar daddies" and "sugar babies" to meet.

According to a contractor, in April 2019, Ajayi asked him to build a secret soundproofed room under the front porch with head-height hooks on the wall and a fingerprint scanner for entry. Ajayi claimed that he wanted to hide alcohol from his Mormon girlfriend. The contractor was uncomfortable with the request and turned it down. A cleaner separately said that she noticed a lot of cameras in Ajayi's home, especially in the master bedroom.

Prior to murdering Lueck, Ajayi sexually assaulted a woman whom he had met on a dating app and invited to his residence. On March 10, 2018, Ajayi invited the woman into his home. While they watched TV on his couch he began “intensely” kissing the victim and trying to inappropriately and forcefully touch her. When she tried to get away, Ajayi pinned her down and bit her at least three times, causing "significant pain" and leaving "bruising and bite marks." According to the North Park Police Department of North Logan, Utah, Ajayi was also investigated in connection with a rape reported in 2014. The alleged victim did not pursue charges. Ajayi has also been accused by his ex-wife of threatening to have someone kidnap and kill her, leading her to cut off communication with him. Ajayi's ex-wife also reported that he would get “real aggressive” when she didn’t do what he demanded.

Ajayi wrote a book called Forge Identity featuring two characters who are killed and burned. The book features Ezekiel, the protagonist, who as a teenager “must decide if he will join the ranks of a criminal mastermind, or fight to escape the tyranny that has surrounded his young life”. The book was sold on Amazon and the author's name was the same as that of Ajayi. A Facebook page with photos of Ajayi promoted the book. The book was later taken off Amazon.

== Murder ==
On June 17, 2019, in the early morning hours, Lueck arrived at the Salt Lake City International Airport from California. She was picked up by a Lyft driver and taken to Hatch Park, where she had agreed to meet Ajayi. According to Ajayi's defense attorney, Lueck had met him on a dating website in 2018. Lueck and Ajayi agreed to meet up once she returned from California to Utah. Lueck, who told the driver she was meeting a friend, was dropped off at around 3:00 am.

Ajayi had planned to murder Lueck prior to picking her up, turning off the video of his home security system to avoid documenting her presence in his home. Once he and Lueck were at his residence in the Fairpark neighborhood, he tied her hands behind her back with zip ties and rope and tried to choke her with his hands, continuing after Lueck told him to stop. Ajayi says he then moved Lueck onto her stomach and strangled her with a belt until she stopped moving. Additionally, Lueck suffered blunt force trauma on the left side of her head. She was also found to be missing part of her scalp and had a 5 cm (2.0 in) hole in her skull.

An autopsy found that the blunt force trauma to the left side of her skull caused brain hemorrhaging that ultimately killed her. According to District Attorney Sim Gill, the evidence suggested that Ajayi murdered Lueck to see what it felt like to kill.

After murdering Lueck, Ajayi claims he buried her body and some of her belongings in his backyard and threw some of her belongings into the Jordan River. The next day, he burned her remains. Days later, after police came to Ajayi’s house to ask him questions about Lueck’s disappearance, Ajayi dug up Lueck's remains and took them to Logan Canyon where he buried Lueck in a wooded area in a shallow grave.

== Criminal proceedings ==
On June 20, Lueck's father called the Salt Lake City Police Department to inform them that no one had heard from her since she arrived back in Utah. On June 28, a Salt Lake City man, identified as Ayoola Ajayi, was arrested and charged with the kidnapping and aggravated murder of Lueck, along with desecration of her body. Detectives found that Lueck and Ajayi had exchanged several text messages in the early morning of June 17, with Lueck’s last text to him being at 2:58 am. Cell phone data placed both Lueck and Ajayi in the park at 2:59 am. Additionally, prosecutors say photos of Lueck were found on Ajayi's phone.

A search of and around Ajayi's property yielded Lueck’s belongings and some of her remains. Specifically, a freshly dug area in his yard contained her charred personal items, charred muscle tissue which the Utah State Crime Lab identified as Lueck’s, and bone. Neighbors reported that Ajayi had bonfires behind his garage on June 17 and 18 that resulted in a “horrible smell.” Additionally, charred fabric and other items were found in a nearby alleyway. Investigators also searched Ajayi's vehicle which they reported smelled strongly of gas. There, they found a red gas can, similar to the one he purchased at 9:00 am June 17.

After being arrested, Ajayi told his attorneys where Lueck was buried. His attorneys then worked with prosecutors to find Lueck's body. On July 3 while searching, investigators found recently disturbed ground off the main road in a wooded area. There, in a shallow grave, was a charred human body. On July 5, police reported that Lueck's body had been recovered in Logan Canyon. The medical examiner’s office determined that the body was Lueck's. According to Salt Lake County District Attorney Sim Gill, Ajayi's phone records place him in Logan Canyon on June 25, between 2:30 pm and 4:30 pm.

The trial for Lueck's murder was originally set for March 12, 2020, but was postponed so that prosecutors would have more time to go through evidence and give it to Ajayi's defense attorneys. A three-day preliminary hearing was set for October 28, 2020. On October 7, 2020, Ajayi pleaded guilty to first-degree aggravated murder and third-degree desecration of a human body in connection with Lueck's death. In exchange, prosecutors dropped charges of aggravated kidnapping and obstructing justice and removed the possibility of the death penalty. District Attorney Sim Gill said the guilty pleas allow Lueck’s parents to begin to obtain closure and a “measure of justice.” On October 23, 3rd District Judge Vernice Trease sentenced Ajayi to life in prison without the possibility of parole. In addition, Ajayi was sentenced to five years in prison for desecrating Lueck's body. He apologized in court, though Gill told media he didn't believe the apology was genuine. Lueck's parents gave a statement, speaking about how they will never get to see their only daughter marry and have children. Lueck's father said, "My daughter Mackenzie Lueck was a sweet, amazing young lady with the world ahead of her. She was a kindhearted person that cared about others. Now, I will not have the opportunity to see her blossom in life". Lueck's cousin stated "This is a nightmare you can't wake up from. I will never be able to forgive what happened to her. I will never forgive the monster who took her life. Never in my life have I felt anger the way I have the last 16 months. Never have I been so fearful for my life because I know how real evil is in this world".

Ajayi was also charged with the March 2018 kidnapping of another woman who he met on a dating app. The victim came forward after Ajayi was arrested for Lueck's murder. A trial for this case was set for December 2-3, 2020. Ajayi pleaded guilty to one count of second-degree forcible sexual abuse in connection to this case on October 7, 2020. He was later sentenced to one to 15 years in prison for the crime.

Ajayi also was charged with 19 counts of sexual exploitation of a minor. These charges came about in August 2019 after police also say that they found "numerous pornographic photos of children on his computer as they investigated Lueck’s death" on July 2. The photos allegedly depicted children between the ages of four and eight. A preliminary hearing regarding these charges was scheduled to be held on October 1, 2020. Ajayi pleaded not guilty to the charges on October 1, 2020. The pornography charges were later dismissed.

== See also ==
- List of kidnappings
- List of solved missing person cases (post-2000)
