= Birchfield v. North Dakota =

- Supreme Court of the United States

Argued April 20, 2016 Decided June 23, 2016
- Full case name: Danny Birchfield, Petitioner v. State of North Dakota
- Docket no.: 14-1468
- Citations: 579 U.S. 438 (more) 136 S. Ct. 2160; 195 L. Ed. 2d 560
- Argument: Oral argument
- Opinion announcement: Opinion announcement

Case history
- Prior: On writ of certiorari to the Supreme Court of North Dakota

Holding
- 1. The Fourth Amendment permits warrantless breath tests incident to arrests for drunk driving but not warrantless blood tests. 2. Motorists who refuse to submit to a blood test may face civil but not criminal penalties.

Court membership
- Chief Justice John Roberts Associate Justices Anthony Kennedy · Clarence Thomas; Ruth Bader Ginsburg · Stephen Breyer; Samuel Alito · Sonia Sotomayor; Elena Kagan

Case opinions
- Majority: Alito, joined by Roberts, Kennedy, Breyer, Kagan
- Concur/dissent: Sotomayor, joined by Ginsburg
- Concur/dissent: Thomas

Laws applied
- U.S. Const. amend. IV

Birchfield v. North Dakota, 579 U.S. 438 (2016) is a case in which the Supreme Court of the United States held that the search incident to arrest doctrine permits law enforcement to conduct warrantless breath tests but not blood tests on suspected drunk drivers.

== Background ==
Birchfield was a consolidation of three cases: Birchfield v. North Dakota, Bernard v. Minnesota, and Beylund v. Levi. Birchfield was charged with violation of a North Dakota statute for refusing to submit to blood alcohol content testing; Bernard was charged with a violation of a Minnesota statute for refusing to submit to breath alcohol testing; Beylund underwent a blood alcohol test consistent with North Dakota's implied consent law and challenged the constitutionality of that law after an administrative hearing based on the test results led to the revocation of his license.

== Issue ==
In Missouri v. McNeely, 569 U.S. 141 (2013), the Court held that in the absence of an argument based on facts specific to the case "the natural dissipation of alcohol from the bloodstream does not always constitute an exigency justifying the warrantless taking of a blood sample". In contrast to the court's 1966 finding in Schmerber v. California, 384 U. S. 757 held that the same exigent circumstance did exist by inferring that an officer might reasonably believe it to exist. The court "did not address any potential justification for warrantless testing of drunk driving suspects, except for the exception 'at issue in the case,' namely, the exception for exigent circumstances".

The issue before the court was how the "search incident to arrest doctrine applies to breath and blood tests". Is warrantless alcohol testing incident to drunk driving arrests to determine blood alcohol content a violation of the Fourth Amendment?

== Decision ==
The Court held that both breath tests and blood tests constitute a search under the Fourth Amendment. The Court then proceeded to analyze both types of tests under the search incident to arrest doctrine, weighing on the one hand "the degree to which it intrudes upon an individual’s privacy" and on the other hand "the degree to which it is needed for the promotion of legitimate governmental interests." Applied to breath tests, the Court concluded that breath tests do not implicate significant privacy concerns. Blood tests, on the other hand, are significantly more intrusive. Turning to the government's interest in the tests, the Court concluded that compulsory tests serve the very important function of providing an incentive to cooperate in alcohol testing. Weighing these interests, the Court concluded that requiring breath tests is constitutional; however, requiring blood tests is not, as the goal of traffic safety can be obtained by less invasive means (such as breath tests).

In the majority opinion, in addressing the limits of implied consent laws, the court stated that while their "prior opinions have referred approvingly to the general concept of implied-consent laws" that "there must be a limit to the consequences to which motorists may be deemed to have consented by virtue of a decision to drive on public roads" and "that motorists could be deemed to have consented to only those conditions that are 'reasonable' in that they have a 'nexus' to the privilege of driving".

The Court ruled in favor of Birchfield who was prosecuted for refusing a warrantless blood draw and ruled against Bernard who refused a warrantless breath test. Beylund, on the other hand consented to a blood test after police advised him that he was required to do. The court therefore remanded Beylund's case back to the state court "to reevaluate Beylund's consent given the partial inaccuracy of the officer's advisory." The Supreme Court of North Dakota court subsequently avoided the issue by holding that, even assuming the consent was involuntary, the Exclusionary Rule does not apply in the administrative hearing context and thus affirmed suspension of his license for testing over the prohibited level set forth in the implied consent / administrative license suspension statute.

=== Justice Thomas's dissent ===
Justice Clarence Thomas wrote that "the search-incident-to-arrest exception to the Fourth Amendment’s warrant requirement should apply categorically to all blood alcohol tests, including blood tests. By drawing an arbitrary line between blood tests and breath tests, the majority destabilized the law of exceptions to the warrant requirement and made the jobs of both police officers and lower courts more difficult." The Supreme Court ruled in favor of Birchfield in a 7–1 majority stating that the refusal to submit to a warrantless blood test may not be criminalized as it is a violation of the petitioner's Fourth Amendment right against unlawful searches and is protected by neither the search incident to arrest nor exigent circumstances exceptions of the Fourth Amendment's warrant requirement. The Supreme Court also stated that the same rationale applied to the decision of warrantless breath tests was not relevant based on the implication of serious privacy concerns brought about by the administration of blood tests which could be used to obtain information other than the BAC of the suspected drunk driver as well as the intrusive process used to obtain a blood sample.

=== Justice Sotomayor's dissent ===
Justice Sonia Sotomayor wrote that "the Fourth Amendment’s prohibition against warrantless searches should apply to breath tests unless exigent circumstances justify one in a particular case. In establishing exceptions to the warrant requirement, the Court has routinely examined whether a legitimate government interest justified the search in light of the individual’s privacy interest and whether that determination should be made based on a case-by-case analysis or a categorical rule." Justice Sotomayor argued that the administration of a warrantless breath test was not imperative to the prevention of drunk drivers as the suspected drunk driver has already been removed from the roadway and a search warrant could be obtained if necessary. The Supreme Court ruled 6–2 in favor of The State of North Dakota stating that warrantless breath tests are protected under the search incident to arrest warrant exception of the Fourth Amendment's warrant requirement and require minimal physical intrusion. The Supreme Court majority also argued that the administration of a warrantless breath tests serves the government's objectives of deterring drunk drivers as well as effectively allowing law enforcement officers to remove already present drunk drivers from the roadways.

== See also ==
- List of United States Supreme Court cases
- Lists of United States Supreme Court cases by volume
- List of United States Supreme Court cases by the Roberts Court
- 2017 University of Utah Hospital incident
