= John A. Moran =

John Moran

Personal details
- Born: March 22, 1932 Los Angeles, California, U.S.
- Died: September 28, 2023 (aged 91) Salt Lake City, Utah, U.S.
- Party: Republican
- Education: University of Utah (BS); New York University; University of Southern; California

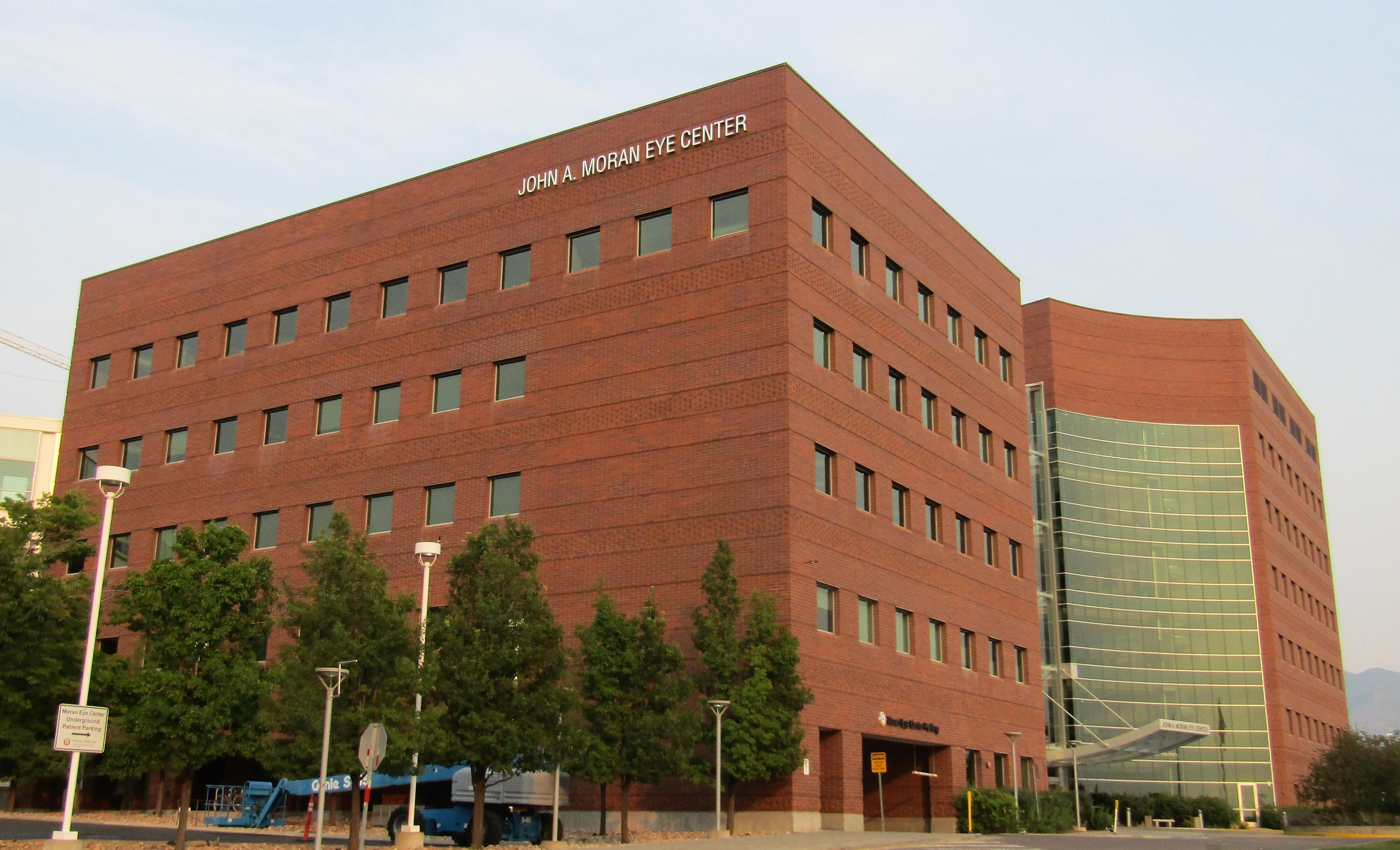
Eye care center in Salt Lake City, Utah.

John Arthur Moran (March 22, 1932 – September 28, 2023) was an American businessman, investment executive, philanthropist, and political fundraiser. He served as president, CEO, and chairman of Dyson-Kissner-Moran Corporation, an international investment and holding company.

== Personal life and education ==
Moran was born in Los Angeles, California in 1932. His father was a self-taught accountant. Moran graduated from the University of Utah in 1954, majoring in banking and finance. After graduation, Moran joined the Navy via Officer Candidate School, serving for three years, mostly as an aerial photographic intelligence officer at Pearl Harbor. Moran died in Salt Lake City on September 28, 2023, at the age of 91.

== Career ==
After leaving the Navy, Moran worked at Blyth & Company, Inc., an investment banking firm, eventually becoming a vice president. In 1967, Moran joined Dyson-Kissner, becoming an executive vice president in 1974. Moran retired from Dyson Kissner-Moran in 1998. Moran has also served as Senior Advisor of Catalytic Capital Investment Corporation and as president of Rutherford-Moran Exploration Company, a subsidiary of Chevron Thailand. Moran also served on the board of Wynn Resorts.

== Philanthropy ==
Moran helped establish the John A. Moran Eye Center at the University of Utah and is affiliated with the Metropolitan Museum of Art, the National Advisory Council of the University of Utah, and the George and Barbara Bush Endowment for Innovation Cancer Research at M.D. Anderson Cancer Center at the University of Texas. Moran helped finance the John A. and Carole O. Moran Gallery for later Roman art and sarcophagi at the Metropolitan Museum.

== Political activities ==
Moran served as the finance chair of the Republican National Committee from 1993 to 1995, and as national finance chairman of Bob Dole's 1996 presidential campaign. Moran also served as an honorary co-chairman of the Republican Leadership Council. In 1997, Moran wrote a letter opposing the power of the Christian Coalition and the far-right in the Republican Party. Moran was a top fundraiser for John McCain in 2008 and joined the Mitt Romney campaign in April 2012. Moran has donated to the political causes of the Koch Brothers.
