= University of Utah Hospital =

- University of Utah Health
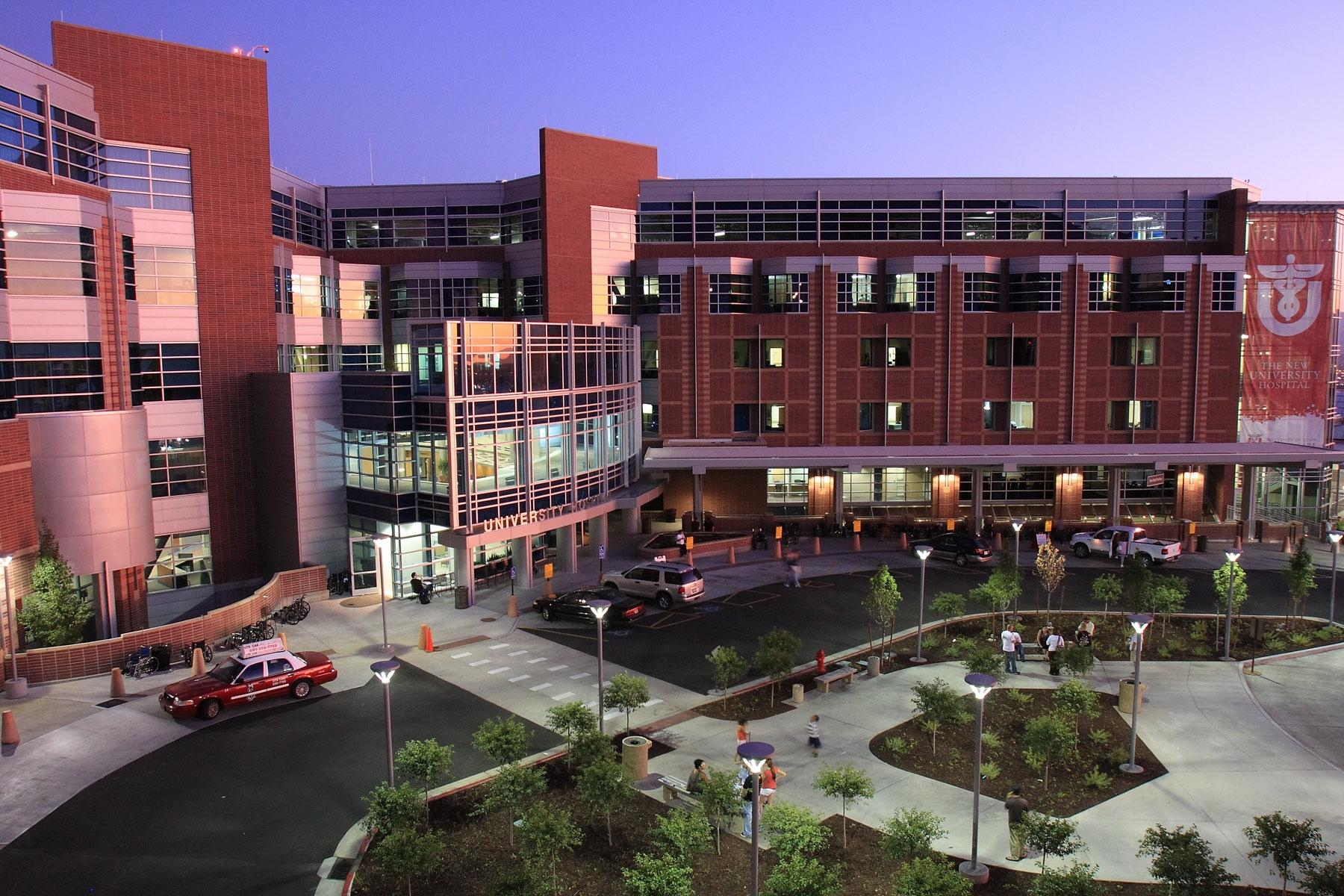

Geography
- Location: Salt Lake City, Utah, United States
- Coordinates: 40°46′18″N 111°50′12″W

Organization
- Care system: Public
- Type: Teaching
- Affiliated university: University of Utah
- Patron: None

Services
- Standards: DNV Healthcare accreditation
- Emergency department: Level I trauma center
- Beds: 425

History
- Opened: 1965

Links
- Website: http://healthcare.utah.edu/locations/hospital/
- Lists: Hospitals in Utah

The University of Utah Hospital is a research and teaching hospital on the campus of the University of Utah in Salt Lake City, Utah. It serves as a major regional referral center for Utah and the surrounding states of Idaho, Nevada, Wyoming, Montana and Colorado. Since 1965, it has grown to become a health care system known as University of Utah Health, which includes five hospitals and twelve community health centers. University of Utah Health is praised for the following specialties: cardiology, geriatrics, gynecology, pediatrics, rheumatology, pulmonology, neurology, oncology, orthopedics, and ophthalmology.

== History ==
University of Utah Hospital opened its doors in 1965, coinciding with the closing of Salt Lake County General Hospital, which had served as the main teaching hospital for the University of Utah School of Medicine since 1942. In September 1981, an expansion to the old building was dedicated. In 1982, Barney Clark received the world's first permanently implanted artificial heart, the Jarvik-7, during an operation performed by William C. DeVries, M.D.

In 2001 the hospital was named as the Intermountain West's first nationally certified Level 1 Trauma Center by the American College of Surgeons. In 2007 the George S. and Dolores Dore Eccles Critical Care Pavilion, an addition to the hospital was opened. A new $200-million patient care pavilion, with space for an additional 100 private patient rooms, was dedicated in July 2009. Mario R. Capecchi, Ph.D. won the 2007 Nobel Prize in Physiology or Medicine as a University of Utah gene targeting pioneer.

In March, 2017, University of Utah Health Care was quietly renamed University of Utah Health. In July 2017, the hospital was part of an incident where the police detective Jeff Payne wrongfully arrested nurse Alex Wubbels. Payne asked Wubbels to provide a blood sample from an unconscious patient, and she was arrested when she refused. Wubbels was later released and no charges were brought against her. In September 2017, after footage of the incident went viral, the hospital announced changes to the hospital protocol meant to stop a similar incident from happening in the future. Under this new protocol, police officers will not be allowed in patient-care areas and will speak with "house supervisors" instead of nurses.

== Medical campus ==
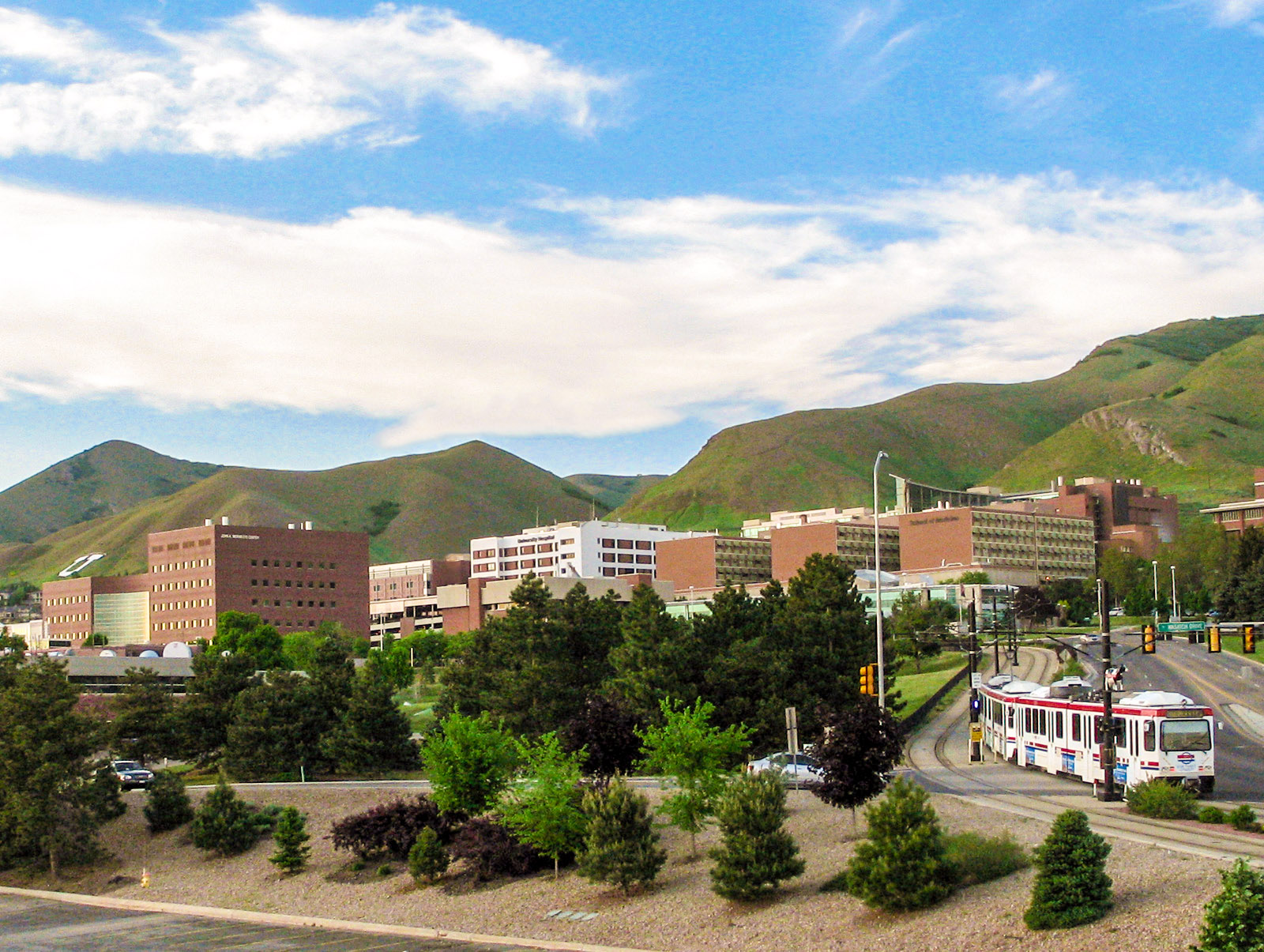
The University of Utah Health Sciences campus in 2009.

University of Utah Health consists of five hospitals, twelve community health centers, and several specialty centers. It relies on more than 1,400 board-certified physicians. The hospitals and specialty centers are on the University of Utah campus in two areas: the Health Sciences campus in the north and Research Park in the east. The Health Sciences campus houses the University of Utah Hospital, Huntsman Cancer Institute, Neilsen Rehabilitation Hospital, Cardiovascular Center, Clinical Neurosciences Center, and Moran Eye Center. The Health Sciences campus also houses the School of Medicine, Intermountain Burn Unit, and Primary Children's Hospital, one of only two children's hospitals in Utah. Primary Children's Hospital, though linked to University of Utah Health, is owned and operated by Intermountain Health Care. Research Park houses the Huntsman Mental Health Institute, University Orthopaedic Center, and Utah Diabetes Center.

== Community Health Centers ==
University of Utah Health is located in five counties in Utah through its community health centers. Salt Lake County is the location of Madsen Health Center (on campus), Sugar House Health Center and Redwood Health Center (both off-campus in Salt Lake City), South Main Clinic (South Salt Lake, Utah), Westridge Health Center (West Valley City, Utah), Greenwood Health Center (Midvale, Utah), and South Jordan Health Center. Davis County has Centerville Health Center and Farmington Health Center. Summit county has Redstone Health Center (Park City, Utah). Utah County has Parkway Health Center (Orem, Utah). Tooele County has Stansbury Health Center (Stansbury Park).

== Organization ==
The University of Utah Hospitals & Clinics are administered under the direction of the Community Board of Directors of University of Utah Health. The board is under the authority of the University of Utah's Board of Trustees. The CEO of University of Utah Health is also the Senior Vice President of Health Sciences and reports to the president of the University of Utah.
