= Republican Leadership Council =

Political advocacy group and political action committee

The Republican Leadership Council (RLC or RLC-PAC) was founded in 1993 as the Committee for Responsible Government. It was a United States political advocacy group and political action committee that promoted Republican candidates who choose a platform that the organization characterized as "fiscally conservative, socially inclusive." Issues championed by the RLC include small government, lower taxes, balanced budgets, environmental protection and school choice, often including school vouchers.

The organization was chaired by former Missouri Senator John Danforth and former New Jersey Governor Christine Todd Whitman and tended to be critical of what it considered to be the disproportionate role of conservative Christians in the Republican Party.

In 2011, the RLC was dissolved. However, a new Republican Leadership Council of California has been formed to support moderate Republican policies, starting in California.

== History ==
The Committee for Responsible Government (CRG) was founded by a group of moderate Republicans in 1992 as a response to the 1992 Republican National Convention in Houston, Texas where Pat Buchanan, an unsuccessful challenger to former President George H. W. Bush, gave a controversial address which has become known as the "culture war" speech.

Founding members of the CRG included financier Lewis M. Eisenberg, New Jersey Governor Christine Todd Whitman, Representative Susan Molinari (NY-14), Representative Richard A. Zimmer (NJ-12), Massachusetts Governor William F. Weld, and Connecticut Governor John G. Rowland. The organization departed notably from the Republican Party platform by including a pro-choice position on abortion in its "guiding principles."

In 1997, the organization renamed itself the Republican Leadership Council in a nod to its Democratic counterpart, the centrist Democratic Leadership Council. The RLC dropped its embattled stance on abortion in favor of a neutral affirmation of the importance of "protecting individual rights" and "promoting strong families." Governor John Engler of Michigan and Senator Jon Kyl of Arizona, Republicans who oppose abortion were recruited to model a more inclusive position on that issue. Financier Henry Kravis and John A. Moran, the national finance chairman of Bob Dole's 1996 presidential campaign, were named as the organization's co-chairs.

In the Republican Party primary of California's 2002 gubernatorial election, the RLC endorsed Los Angeles Mayor Richard Riordan over Bill Simon, sponsoring attack ads blaming Simon for the 1993 failure of Western Federal Savings and Loan. RLC board members and Senators Jon Kyl and Frank Murkowski condemned the ads and issued statements distancing themselves from the RLC.

The RLC was inactive for several years after 2003, but was revived after the 2006 midterm elections by Whitman, former Missouri Senator John Danforth and former Maryland Lieutenant Governor Michael Steele. Whitman said that the Republicans' loss of control of Congress signaled a need for the party to return to its "fiscally conservative roots" and to be "less judgmental." In March 2007, Whitman's political action committee, "It's My Party, Too" (IMP-PAC), was merged into RLC-PAC.

In 2008, Michael Steele left the RLC, of which he was a founding member, citing disagreements over endorsing primary candidates. Some contend that his departure was an effort to boost his chances of becoming the RNC chair. He contends that he withdrew from the group in early 2008, while the RLC listed him as a member until his campaign for chair of the GOP began in December 2008.

== Board members ==
- John Danforth, co-chair (former senator, MO)
- Christine Todd Whitman, co-chair (former governor, NJ)
- Trammell Crow
- Nancy Johnson (former representative, CT-5)
- David Lack
- James B. Nicholson
- Tom Ridge (former governor, PA)
- Joe Schwarz (former representative, MI-7)
- Rob Simmons (former representative, CT-2)
- Candace Straight
- Jane Swift (former governor, MA)

=== Former members ===
- Michael Steele (former RNC chair and original cofounder of RLC; left in 2008 over the endorsement of candidates in primaries)
- Frank Murkowski (former Alaska senator and governor; left over attack ads)
- Jon Kyl (former Arizona senator; left over attack ads)

== Disbandment and rebirth in California ==
In 2011, the RLC national organization was dissolved when Governor Christine Todd Whitman retired from politics. However, a new RLC political action committee was founded shortly before in California. Known as the Republican Leadership Council of California (RLCC), it is philosophically aligned with the original RLC organization; was chaired by RLC's former California state coordinator; and was granted permission to continue using the same name/brand.

RLCC describes its supporters and candidates as practical, "traditional Republicans", in the manner of Abraham Lincoln and Theodore Roosevelt. RLCC's strategy is heavily focused on achieving long-term electoral gains for moderate Republicans for legislative, congressional, and other high offices by building a strong bench of moderate Republicans elected to local offices in the bluest parts of California.

== See also ==
- Blue Dog Coalition
- Republican Liberty Caucus
- Republican Main Street Partnership
