= Schmerber v. California =

- Supreme Court of the United States

Argued April 25, 1966 Decided June 20, 1966
- Full case name: Armando Schmerber, Petitioner v. State of California
- Citations: 384 U.S. 757 (more) 86 S. Ct. 1826; 16 L. Ed. 2d 908; 1966 U.S. LEXIS 1129

Case history
- Prior: Certiorari to the Appellate Department of the Superior Court of California, County of Los Angeles

Holding
- 1. The forced extraction and analysis of a blood sample is not compelled testimony and therefore does not violate the Fifth Amendment Right against self-incrimination 2. Intrusions into the human body require a warrant 3. Here, the warrantless blood test was permissible under the exigent circumstances exception to prevent the destruction of alcohol in the blood stream through the body's natural metabolic processes

Court membership
- Chief Justice Earl Warren Associate Justices Hugo Black · William O. Douglas; Tom C. Clark · John M. Harlan II; William J. Brennan Jr. · Potter Stewart; Byron White · Abe Fortas

Case opinions
- Majority: Brennan, joined by Clark, Harlan, Stewart, White
- Concurrence: Harlan, joined by Stewart
- Dissent: Warren
- Dissent: Black, joined by Douglas
- Dissent: Douglas
- Dissent: Fortas

Laws applied
- U.S. Const. amends. IV, V, VI, XIV

Schmerber v. California, 384 U.S. 757 (1966), is a landmark United States Supreme Court case in which the Court clarified the application of the Fourth Amendment's protection against warrantless searches and the Fifth Amendment right against self-incrimination for searches that intrude into the human body. Until Schmerber, the Supreme Court had not yet clarified whether state police officers must procure a search warrant before taking blood samples from criminal suspects. Likewise, the Court had not yet clarified whether blood evidence taken against the wishes of a criminal suspect may be used against that suspect in the course of a criminal prosecution. (Note: In 1957, the United States Supreme Court considered a similar case, Breithaupt v. Abram, where police officers took blood from an unconscious patient suspected of driving under the influence of alcohol. The Court ultimately held that the blood sample was admissible as evidence under the theory that procuring the sample did not violate substantive due process. However, at the time the Court issued its ruling in Breithaupt, the Fourth Amendment's exclusionary rule and the Fifth Amendment right against self-incrimination had not yet been incorporated to the states.)

In a 5–4 opinion, the Court held that forced extraction and analysis of a blood sample is not compelled testimony; therefore, it does not violate the Fifth Amendment right against self-incrimination. The Court also held that intrusions into the human body ordinarily require a search warrant. However, the Court ruled that the involuntary, warrantless blood sample taken in this case was justified under the Fourth Amendment's exigent circumstances exception because evidence of blood alcohol would be destroyed by the body's natural metabolic processes if the officers were to wait for a warrant. In 2013, the Supreme Court clarified in Missouri v. McNeely that the natural metabolism of alcohol in the bloodstream is not a per se exigency that would always justify warrantless blood tests of individuals suspected of driving under the influence of alcohol.

In the years following the Court's decision in Schmerber, many legal scholars feared the ruling would be used to limit civil liberties. Other scholars, including Nita A. Farahany, Benjamin Holley, and John G. New, have suggested courts may use the ruling in Schmerber to justify the use of mind reading devices against criminal suspects. Because the Court's ruling in Schmerber prohibited the use of warrantless blood tests in most circumstances, some commentators argue that the decision was responsible for the proliferation of breathalyzers to test for alcohol and urine analyses to test for controlled substances in criminal investigations.

== Background ==
=== Warrantless searches of the human body ===
In the 1950s, the Supreme Court of the United States issued two key rulings clarifying the constitutionality of physical intrusions into the human body by police and other government agents. In Rochin v. California, police officers broke into the home of an individual suspected of selling narcotics and observed him place several small objects into his mouth. Officers were unable to force his mouth open, so they transported him to a local hospital where his stomach was pumped against his will. A unanimous Supreme Court held the involuntary stomach pump was an unlawful violation of substantive due process because it "shocked the conscience", and was so "brutal" and "offensive" that it did not comport with traditional ideas of fair play and decency. In 1957, the Court held in Breithaupt v. Abram that involuntary blood samples "taken by a skilled technician" neither "shocked the conscience" nor violated substantive due process. In Breithaupt, police took a blood sample from a patient suspected of driving under the influence of alcohol while he lay unconscious in a hospital. The Court held that the blood samples were justified, in part, because "modern community living requires modern scientific methods of crime detection." Additionally, the Court mentioned in dicta that involuntary blood samples may violate the constitution if officers do not provide "every proper medical precaution" to the accused.

=== Fourth Amendment exclusionary rule ===
Until the twentieth century, courts would admit evidence at trial even if it was seized in violation of the Fourth Amendment. Although the Supreme Court developed an exclusionary rule for federal cases in Weeks v. United States and Silverthorne Lumber Co. v. United States, the Court held in 1949 that the exclusionary rule did not apply to the states. In Rochin, the Court held that evidence obtained in a manner that "shocks the conscience" must be excluded in criminal prosecutions but the court declined to incorporate a broad exclusionary rule for all Fourth Amendment violations. By the middle of the twentieth century, many state courts had crafted their own exclusionary rules. In 1955, the California Supreme Court ruled in People v. Cahan that the Fourth Amendment's exclusionary rule applied in California because it was necessary to deter constitutional violations by law enforcement. In 1961, the Supreme Court of the United States relied upon Cahan to hold in Mapp v. Ohio that the exclusionary rule was incorporated to the states.

=== Arrest and prosecution ===
On the night of November 12, 1964, Armando Schmerber and a passenger were driving home after drinking at a tavern and bowling alley in the San Fernando Valley region of Los Angeles, California, when their car skidded off the road and struck a tree. Schmerber and his companion were injured in the crash and taken to a hospital for treatment. When investigating police officers arrived at the hospital, they asked Schmerber to submit a sample of his blood, but Schmerber refused. Although they did not possess a search warrant, officers instructed attending physicians to take a blood sample from Schmerber. The blood sample indicated that Schmerber was intoxicated, and he was placed under arrest. The blood sample was ultimately admitted into evidence at trial, and Schmerber was convicted for driving under the influence of intoxicating liquors. Schmerber objected to the admissibility of the blood sample, claiming that the police violated his rights to due process, his right against self-incrimination, his right to counsel, and his right not to be subjected to unreasonable searches and seizures. The Appellate Department of the California Superior Court rejected Schmerber's arguments, and the California District Court of Appeal declined to review his case. (Note: In 1957, the California Supreme Court held in People v. Duroncelay that warrantless, involuntary blood samples taken from an individual suspected of driving under the influence of alcohol do not violate the constitution and may be admitted into evidence at trial.)

=== Arguments before the Court ===
"I think it follows if this Court holds that it's proper to withdraw the blood that is certainly just as proper to inject the Nalline if we're looking at the welfare of society and how we want to keep narcotic users off the street."

— Thomas M. McGurrin, counsel for Armando Schmerber, during oral argument at the Supreme Court of the United States

Schmerber submitted an appeal to the Supreme Court of the United States, which granted certiorari on January 17, 1966. In his brief, Schmerber argued, among other things, that the warrantless blood test violated his Fourth Amendment right to be free from unlawful searches and seizures, as well as his Fifth Amendment right against self-incrimination. (Note: In his brief, Schmerber also relied upon Wong Sun v. United States, 371 U.S. 471 (1963), to argue that testimonial evidence discovered as a result of an unlawful search should be excluded as "fruit of the poisonous tree.") The Los Angeles City Attorney's office represented the State of California on appeal. In their brief, the City Attorney argued that the blood test did not violate the Fourth Amendment because the seizure was conducted incident to a lawful arrest. The City Attorney also argued that admitting the sample into evidence did not violate Schmerber's Fifth Amendment right against self-incrimination because blood is not testimonial evidence under the Fifth Amendment. Oral arguments were held on April 25, 1966, and the Court issued its opinion on June 20, 1966.

== Opinion of the Court ==
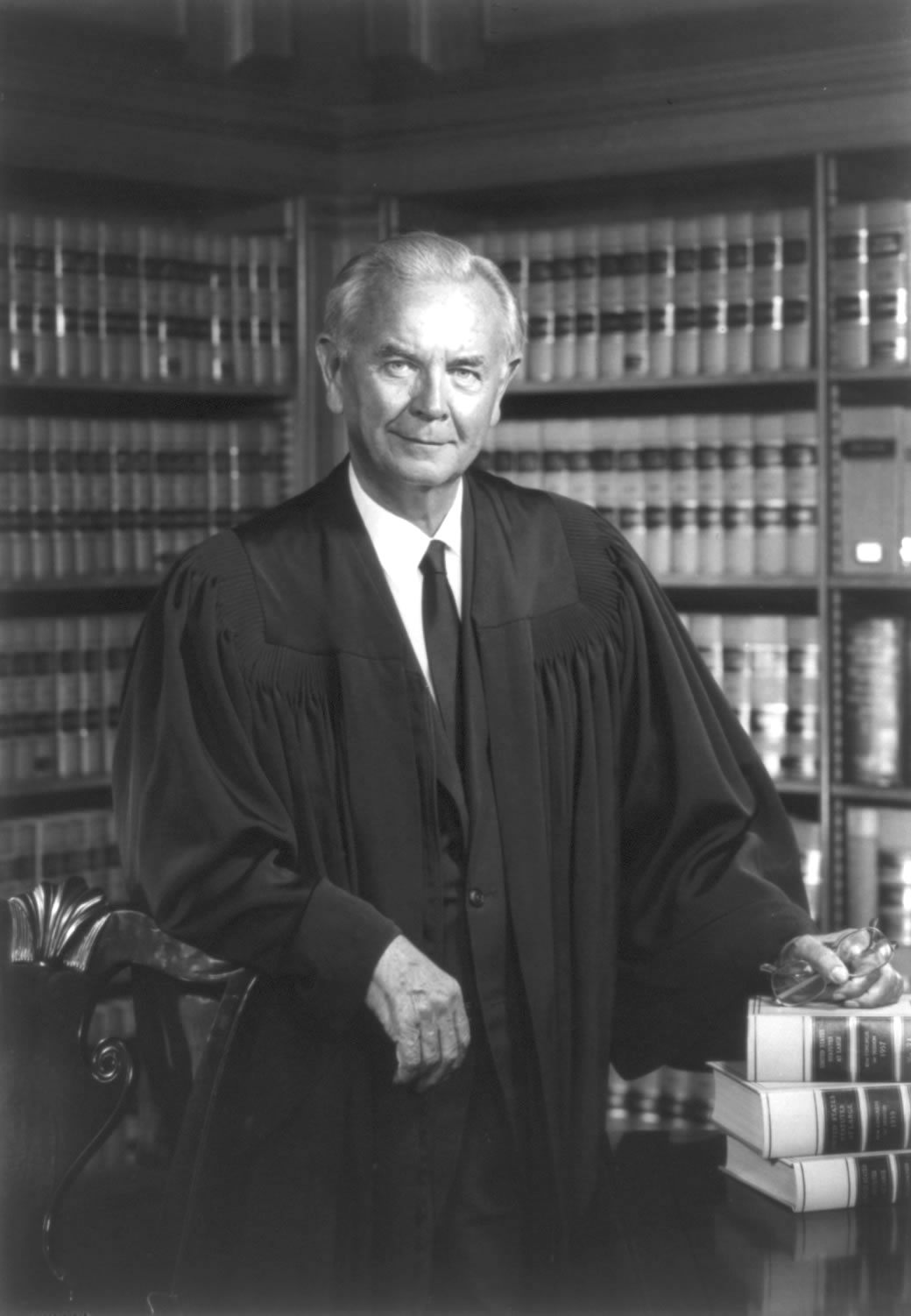
In his majority opinion, Justice William J. Brennan, Jr. emphasized that "[t]he overriding function of the Fourth Amendment is to protect personal privacy and dignity against unwarranted intrusion by the State."

In his majority opinion, Justice William J. Brennan, Jr. held that Schmerber's constitutional rights were not violated when police took his blood without his consent. Relying upon the Court's holding in Breithaupt v. Abram, he concluded that the police did not violate Schmerber's Fifth Amendment right against self-incrimination because the extraction and chemical analysis of the blood sample did not involve "even a shadow of testimonial compulsion." Likewise, Justice Brennan held that the officers did not violate Schmerber's Fourth Amendment right against unreasonable seizures. Justice Brennan wrote that absent exigent circumstances, searches that involve intrusions into the human body require a search warrant. Here, the search was not justified as a search incident to arrest because weapons and contraband are not ordinarily concealed beneath the skin. However, the involuntary blood draw was justified under the Fourth Amendment's exigent circumstances exception because if the officers had waited to receive a search warrant, evidence of intoxication would have been lost through the body's natural metabolism of alcohol in the bloodstream. He wrote that the responding officer "might reasonably have believed that he was confronted with an emergency," where evidence would be destroyed if he waited to receive a warrant. Additionally, Justice Brennan cautioned that the Court's ruling was limited "only to the facts of the present record" and that "minor intrusions into an individual's body under stringently limited conditions in no way indicates that it permits more substantial intrusions, or intrusions under other conditions."

=== Justice Harlan's concurrence ===
In his concurring opinion, Justice John Marshall Harlan II agreed that the involuntary blood sample did not implicate involuntary testimonial compulsion, but wrote separately to emphasize his opinion that the case before the Court "in no way implicates the Fifth Amendment." Additionally, Justice Harlan cited to his dissent in Miranda v. Arizona where he argued against a broad expansion of the Fifth Amendment right against self-incrimination. Justice Harlan disagreed with the Court's ruling in Miranda and even stated that the case "represents poor constitutional law and entails harmful consequences for the country at large."

=== Dissenting opinions ===
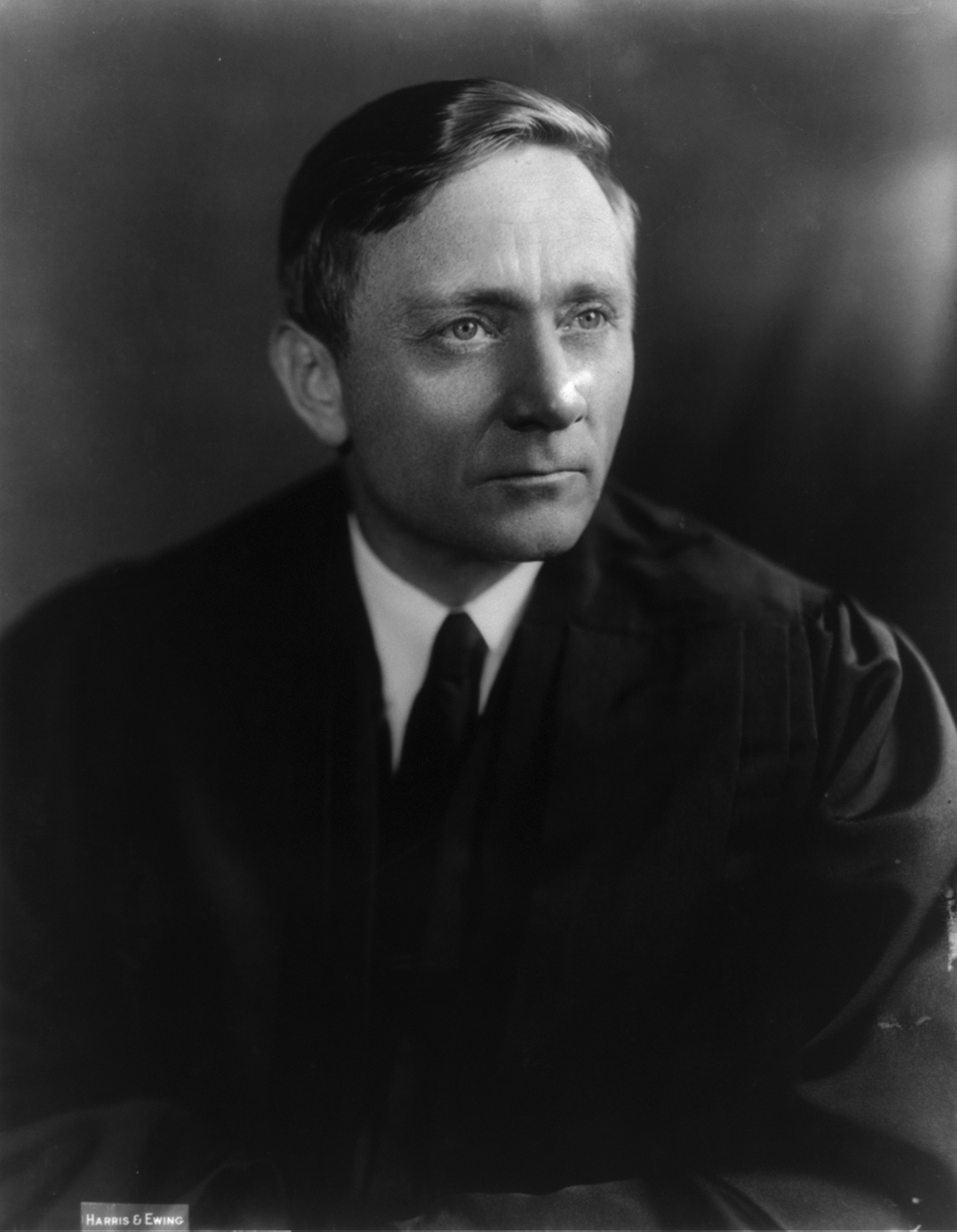
In his dissenting opinion, Justice William O. Douglas wrote that involuntary blood samples violate the right to privacy enumerated in Griswold v. Connecticut.

All four dissenting Justices wrote separate dissenting opinions in Schmerber. Chief Justice Earl Warren reiterated his dissenting opinion in Breithaupt v. Abram, where he argued that involuntary blood samples violate substantive due process. Justice Hugo Black authored an impassioned dissent in which he argued that the officers violated Schmerber's right against self-incrimination. He wrote, "[b]elieving with the Framers that these constitutional safeguards broadly construed by independent tribunals of justice provide our best hope for keeping our people free from governmental oppression, I deeply regret the Court's holding." Justice William O. Douglas also reiterated his dissent in Breithaupt v. Abram, but added that physical invasions into the human body violate the right to privacy enumerated in Griswold v. Connecticut and that "[n]o clearer invasion of this right of privacy can be imagined than forcible bloodletting of the kind involved here." Finally, Justice Abe Fortas wrote that the involuntary blood sample was an act of violence that violated substantive due process and that states may not resort to acts of violence when prosecuting crimes.

== Subsequent developments ==
In the 1970s and 1980s, the Supreme Court revisited questions about the constitutionality of involuntary bodily intrusions in several key cases. In 1973, the Court ruled in Cupp v. Murphy that the police were permitted to extract a tissue sample from underneath a suspect's fingernails to recover "evanescent" physical evidence. The suspect in Cupp was suspected of strangling his wife and voluntarily went to a police station to answer questions. Officers noticed bloodstains under the suspect's fingernails and detained him, but did not place him under arrest. Against the suspect's wishes, the police scraped out a tissue sample from under his fingernails to retrieve the evidence. The biological material found under the suspect's fingernails was later found to have come from the victim. Citing Schmerber, the Court held that this warrantless search was justified under the exigent circumstances exemption of the Fourth Amendment because the search was necessary to preserve the “highly evanescent evidence” under the defendant's fingernails.

Twelve years later, the Court again revisited the topic of involuntary bodily intrusions in Winston v. Lee, where the Court held that the State of Virginia could not force an individual to undergo surgery to extract a bullet that may be evidence of a crime. The Court applied its previous holding in Schmerber to conclude that the surgery would constitute an unreasonable search under the Fourth Amendment and that a crucial factor for evaluating any bodily intrusion "is the extent to which the procedure may threaten the safety or health of the individual." Writing for the Court's majority, Justice Brennan concluded that forcing a patient to undergo major surgery intrudes too far upon individual privacy rights and that surgical intrusions "can only be characterized as severe."

In 1989, the Court ruled in Skinner v. Railway Labor Executives’ Association that warrantless blood tests of railroad employees were reasonable under the Fourth Amendment. The Court reaffirmed that the “compelled intrusio[n] into the body for blood to be analyzed for alcohol content” is a search under the Fourth Amendment, but that warrantless blood tests of railroad employees were necessary to "prevent accidents and casualties in railroad operations that result from impairment of employees by alcohol or drugs.” The Court also concluded that when individuals “participate in an industry that is regulated pervasively to ensure safety,” these individuals “have a reduced expectation of privacy.” Because these employees had a "diminished expectation of privacy," the warrantless blood tests were permissible. Justice Thurgood Marshall and Justice Brennan wrote a dissenting opinion in which they argued that this case was distinguishable from Schmerber because "no such exigency prevents railroad officials from securing a warrant before chemically testing the samples they obtain."

=== South Dakota v. Neville and self-incrimination ===
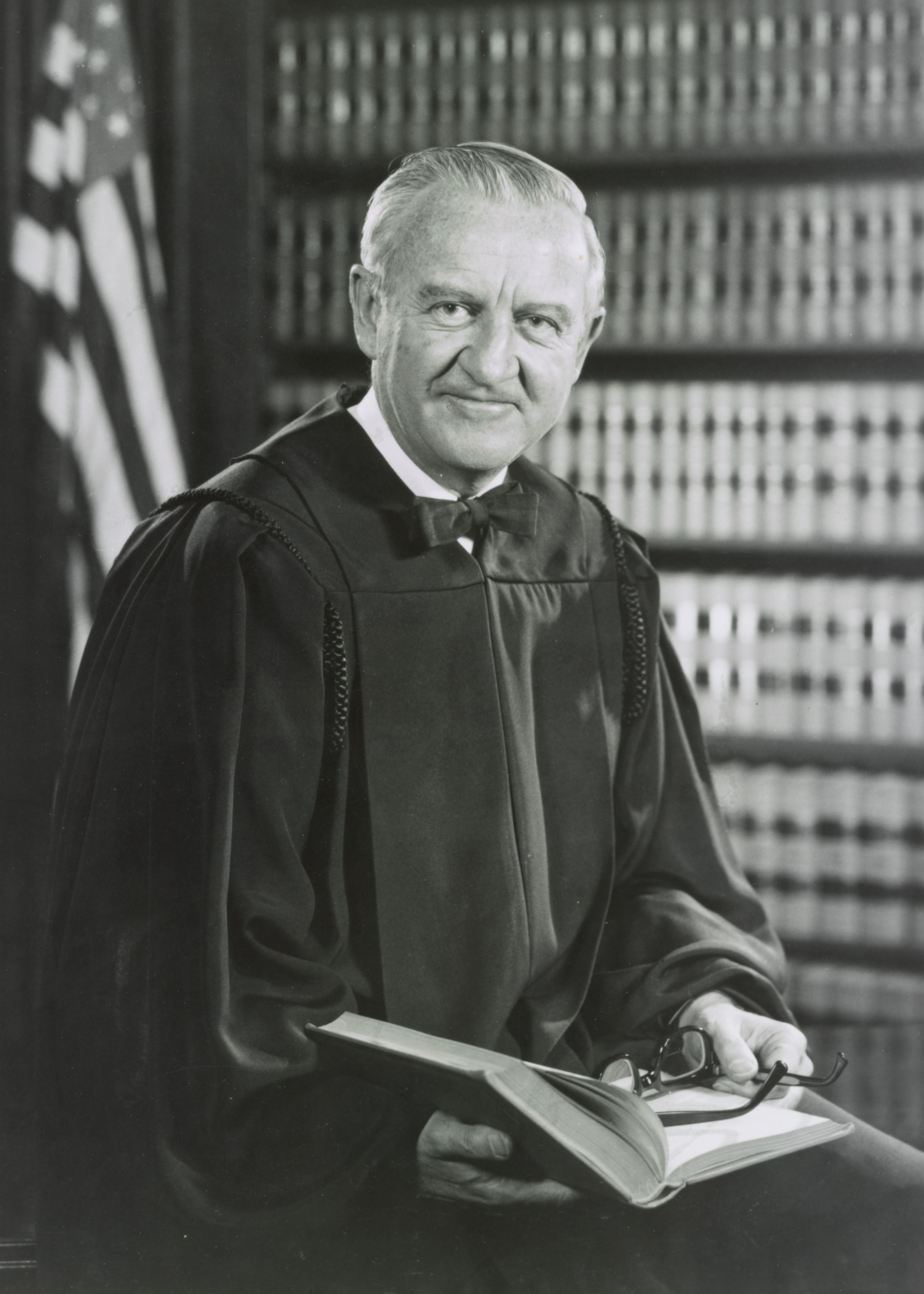
In his dissenting opinion in South Dakota v. Neville, Justice John Paul Stevens wrote that Schmerber intended to adopt a broad and liberal interpretation of the Fifth Amendment right against self-incrimination.

After the Court issued its decision in Schmerber, a split of authority emerged in lower courts with regard to whether the Fifth Amendment's right against self-incrimination prohibited the use of a suspect's refusal to submit to a blood test as evidence of guilt. The United States Supreme Court resolved this split in authority in South Dakota v. Neville, where the Court held that prosecutors could use a suspect's refusal to submit to a blood test as evidence of guilt, and the introduction of this evidence at trial does not violate the suspect's Fifth Amendment right against self-incrimination. Writing for the Court's majority, Justice Sandra Day O'Connor concluded that "the state did not directly compel respondent to refuse the test" and that a "simple blood-alcohol test is so safe, painless, and commonplace" a suspect would not feel coerced to refuse the test. Justice John Paul Stevens wrote a dissenting opinion, joined by Justice Thurgood Marshall, in which he argued that the Court in Schmerber intended to adopt a broad and liberal interpretation of the Fifth Amendment right against self-incrimination.

=== Missouri v. McNeely and the exigent circumstances exception ===
Over time, a split of authority grew among lower courts with regard to whether the Fourth Amendment's exigent circumstances exception allowed officers to always conduct warrantless blood tests on individuals suspected of driving under the influence of alcohol because evidence of alcohol was being destroyed by the body's natural metabolic processes. States that recognized this per se exigency argued that "[o]nce police arrest a suspect for drunk driving, each passing minute eliminates probative evidence of the crime." In 2012, the Court granted review in Missouri v. McNeely to resolve this question. In a 5–4 opinion, the Court rejected the theory that the natural dissipation of blood alcohol constituted a per se exigency. Instead, the court affirmed the basic principle from Schmerber that absent "an emergency that justifie[s] acting without a warrant," police may not conduct warrantless blood testing on suspects. Consequently, exigency in drunk driving cases "must be determined case by case based on the totality of the circumstances."

== Analysis ==
Scholars have described Schmerber v. California as a landmark case and a "watershed moment" in the history of Fourth Amendment jurisprudence. Likewise, John D. Castiglione described the case as "seminal for its place in the annals of Fifth Amendment jurisprudence." Constitutional law scholar Akhil Reed Amar identified Schmerber as a turning point in the Fifth Amendment's "distinction between words and physical evidence." Anne Marie Schubert has also argued that Schmerber served as the genesis for a long line of Supreme Court cases ordering the compelled production of physical evidence. Because Schmerber foreclosed the use of warrantless blood tests in most circumstances, some scholars, including John A. Scanlan, argue that the Court's ruling was responsible for the proliferation of breathalyzers to test for alcohol and urine analysis to test for controlled substances in criminal investigations.

=== Immediate reaction ===
Soon after the Court's ruling, analysts predicted that the effects of the case would be "far-reaching." Some analysts feared the ruling would be used to justify "other intrusive searches." Other commentators also observed that the Court's holding in Schmerber seemed to "reverse direction" from the court's decision in Miranda v. Arizona one week earlier, where the Court enlarged protections against the police for criminal suspects. However, in his assessment of Schmerber, Charles L. Berry praised the decision as a "successful effort to find a practical solution to the problem of the drinking motorist." Additionally, many law journals also offered commentary of the case's significance. For example, a November 1966 article in the Harvard Law Review opined that Justice Brennan's majority opinion was "a good exposition of his view of the interrelationship between the fourth and fifth amendments," and a February 1967 article in the Texas Law Review argued that Schmerber "exemplifies the proposition that the fifth amendment is not absolute."

=== Impact ===
Some legal scholars have criticized the Court's ruling in Schmerber for infringing too far upon civil liberty and privacy. E. John Wherry, Jr., former Dean of the University of Orlando School of Law, wrote that "[b]lindly following Schmerber as authorization for all non-consensual blood seizure for forensic purposes is, in this day and age, an outrage." Writing for the Notre Dame Law Review, Blake A. Bailey, Elaine M. Martin, and Jeffrey M. Thompson observed that although the Court limited the holding in Schmerber to the facts of the case, prior to Winston v. Lee, many lower courts relied upon the ruling to order criminal defendants to undergo surgery to remove bullets that may have been evidence of a crime. Other scholars have expressed concern that the Court's decision to exclude physical evidence from protections against self-incrimination may one day lead to the use of mind reading devices when prosecuting criminal suspects. For example, the Harvard Law Review suggested that the Court's decision may be used to justify monitoring brain waves. Additionally, in an article in the journal Developments in Mental Health Law, Benjamin Holley suggested that "neurotechnological lie detection" could be used in criminal prosecutions, as long as a suspect's words are not "linked with the physical manifestations sought to be introduced at trial." Likewise, in an article in the Journal of Legal Medicine, John G. New suggested that non-testimonial evidence gathered from electroencephalography or magnetic resonance imaging may be admissible to demonstrate a suspect's thoughts.

== See also ==
- Ex post facto law
- Ignorantia juris non excusat
- List of United States Supreme Court cases, volume 384
- List of United States Supreme Court cases by the Warren Court
