= Unified Police Department of Greater Salt Lake =

- Abbreviation: UPD

Agency overview
- Formed: 2009

Jurisdictional structure
- Operations jurisdiction: Salt Lake County, Utah, United States
- General nature: Local civilian police

Operational structure
- Board of Directors responsible: Midvale City Mayor Marcus Stevenson
- Agency executive: Jason Mazuran, Chief of Police

Facilities
- Patrol cars: Ford Police Interceptor (sedans and utility vehicles), Ford F-150, Ford Expedition (K9, Canyon Patrol, Special Operations), Ford Taurus & Toyota Camry (detectives & other administration)

Website
- www.updsl.net

The Unified Police Department of Greater Salt Lake (UPD) is a police department located in Salt Lake County, Utah, United States.

== Description ==
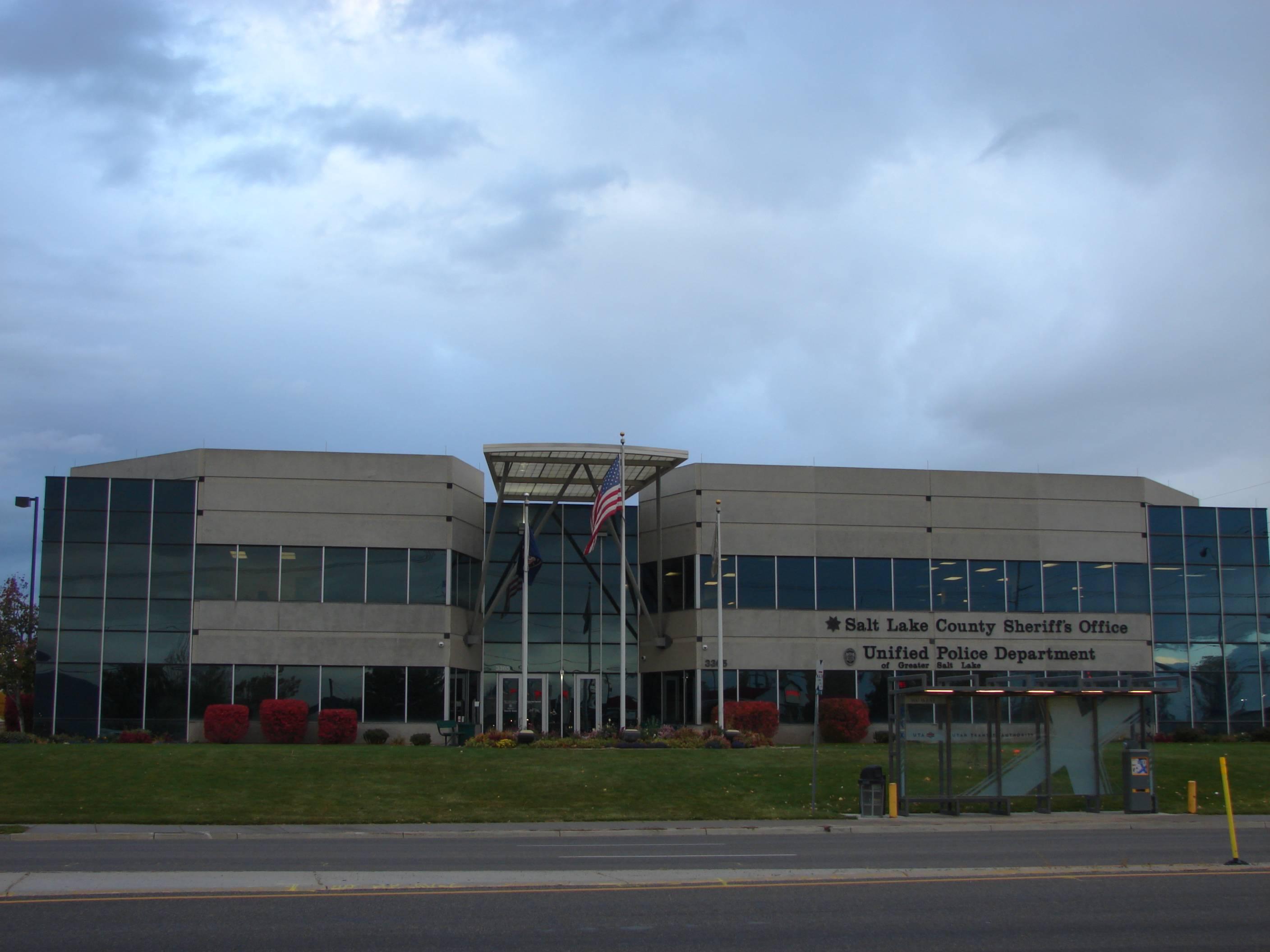
Unified Police Department's former headquarters (once shared with the Salt Lake County Sheriff's Office) in city of South Salt Lake, November 2015.

The UPD is an interlocal civilian law enforcement agency in Salt Lake County, Utah and serves the cities of Magna, Kearns, Midvale, Holladay, and Millcreek. White City, Brighton, Emigration, and Copperton also contract with Unified Police for law enforcement and are serviced by one of the above city precincts.

The UPD was formed in 2009-10 by the Salt Lake County government, the Salt Lake County Sheriff's Office, and several contributing municipalities. It assumed the policing responsibilities and jurisdictions previously held by the Salt Lake County Sheriff's Office. Most of the sheriff's personnel and law enforcement officers were grandfathered into the new police department.

In 2023, the Utah State Legislature passed HB374, a bill which removed the elected sheriff as Unified Police's chief executive officer. Effective July 1, 2024, the Salt Lake County Sheriff exited the Unified Police Department, and re-established its own Law Enforcement Bureau, responsible for policing the unincorporated areas of Salt Lake County as well as perform other duties as required by state law.

Several local media outlets incorrectly reported that HB374 would dissolve UPD; in fact the bill only removed the sheriff as the CEO and UPD was never named directly in the bill. UPD continues to operate, effectively as it has previously, while no longer being associated with the Salt Lake County sheriff.

The UPD is administrated by the UPD board of directors, who appoints a chief of police to act as the organization's chief executive officer. The UPD board appointed Chief Jason Mazuran to serve as chief of police.

== See also ==
- List of law enforcement agencies in Utah
