= Moran Eye Center =

John A. Moran Eye Center
- University of Utah Health Care
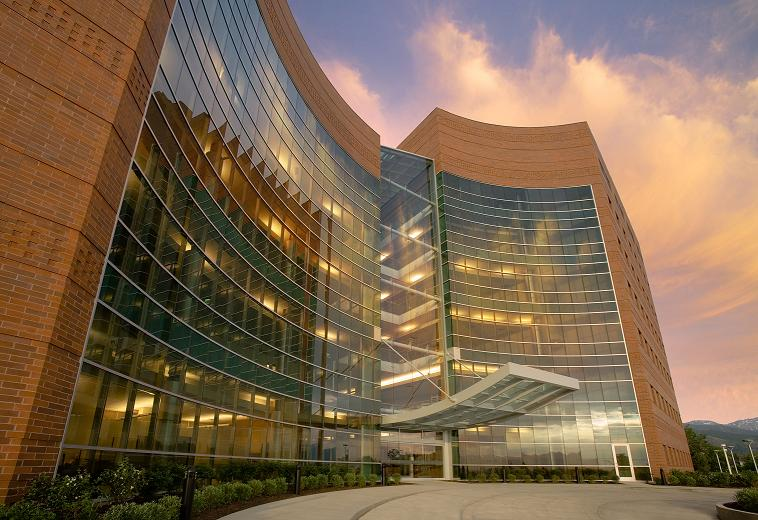
- Moran Eye Center at the University of Utah medical complex

Geography
- Location: 65 Mario Capecchi Drive; Salt Lake City, Utah, United States
- Coordinates: 40.76917°N 111.83690°W

Organization
- Care system: Public
- Affiliated university: University of Utah

History
- Founded: c. 1993

Links
- Website: https://healthcare.utah.edu/Moran/
- Lists: Hospitals in Utah

The John A. Moran Eye Center at the University of Utah is an ophthalmology clinical care and research facility in the Mountain West.

== History ==
The Division of Ophthalmology at the University of Utah began as a one-person operation in 1979 with ophthalmologist and cornea specialist Randall J. Olson. In 1982, the division received departmental status, and a year later Olson was selected as the first chairman of the department. He retains his position as chair of the Department of Ophthalmology and Visual Sciences. In addition, he is the CEO of the John A. Moran Eye Center.

The first Moran Eye Center building was constructed in 1993 with a lead gift from University of Utah alumnus John A. Moran. The 85,000-square-foot facility quickly became too small for the growing department, and in 2006, the Moran Eye Center moved to its current 210,000-square-foot location on Mario Capecchi Drive. Lead donors to the new building included John Moran, the ALSAM Foundation, the George S. and Dolores Doré Eccles Foundation, and the E.R. and Edna Wattis Dumke Foundation. Moran now has 10 additional satellite clinical locations.

== Clinical care ==
John A. Moran Eye Center physicians provide comprehensive care in all ophthalmic subspecialties, making Moran a major referral center for complex cases.

The Utah Lions Eye Bank is part of the Moran Eye Center and serves as a coordinating center for eye tissue donated by Utahns upon their death.

The Moran Eye Center offers its Patient Support Program for patients facing vision loss and their families.

== Research ==
The John A. Moran Eye Center supports 15 laboratories conducting basic and translational research. Moran has researchers addressing several conditions, including glaucoma, age-related macular degeneration, Stargardt disease, optic neuritis, retinal stroke, idiopathic intracranial hypertension, Usher syndrome, and retinopathy of prematurity.

Key research initiatives at the Moran Eye Center include the Intermountain Ocular Research Center, a nonprofit, independent laboratory that performs basic, in-depth scientific research on intraocular lenses, and the Sharon Eccles Steele Center for Translational Medicine works to more quickly and cost-effectively turn scientific discoveries into clinically effective diagnostics and therapies for blinding eye conditions.

== Education ==
Moran faculty provide ophthalmology training to medical students from the University of Utah and other medical schools, and visiting residents and fellows. The Moran Eye Center residency program is accredited by the ACGME.

The Moran Eye Center offers fellowship programs to patients who have completed residency in the United States: cornea, retina, glaucoma, neuro-ophthalmology, uveitis, pediatric, pathology, and international ophthalmology.

== Outreach division ==
The John A. Moran Eye Center Global Outreach Division works in low-resource countries to create sustainable eye care systems by teaching and training local doctors and nurses.
