= Rochin v. California =

- Supreme Court of the United States

Argued October 16, 1951 Decided January 2, 1952
- Full case name: Richard Antonio Rochin v. People of the State of California
- Citations: 342 U.S. 165 (more) 72 S. Ct. 205; 96 L. Ed. 183; 1952 U.S. LEXIS 2576; 25 A.L.R.2d 1396

Case history
- Prior: Defendant convicted, motion for new trial denied, Superior Court of Los Angeles County; affirmed, 225 P. 2d 1 (Cal. Ct. App. 1950); rehearing denied, Cal. Ct. App., December 22, 1951; review denied, Cal., January 11, 1951; cert. granted, 341 U.S. 939 (1951)
- Subsequent: None

Holding
- The use at trial of evidence obtained by conduct that "shocks the conscience" violates due process. Second District Court of Appeal for the Second Appellate District of California reversed.

Court membership
- Chief Justice Fred M. Vinson Associate Justices Hugo Black · Stanley F. Reed; Felix Frankfurter · William O. Douglas; Robert H. Jackson · Harold H. Burton; Tom C. Clark · Sherman Minton

Case opinions
- Majority: Frankfurter, joined by Reed, Jackson, Burton, Vinson, Clark
- Concurrence: Black
- Concurrence: Douglas
- Minton took no part in the consideration or decision of the case.

Laws applied
- U.S. Const. amends. V, XIV

Rochin v. California, 342 U.S. 165 (1952), was a case decided by the Supreme Court of the United States that added behavior that "shocks the conscience" into tests of what violates due process clause of the 14th Amendment. This balancing test is often criticized as having subsequently been used in a particularly subjective manner.

== Background ==
On July 1, 1949, three Los Angeles County deputy sheriffs entered the Rochins' residence without a search warrant and forcibly entered Rochin's room on the second floor.

Upon entering the room, the deputies noticed two capsules on the night stand. Richard Rochin immediately swallowed the capsules after Deputy Jack Jones asked him, "Whose stuff is this?" Jones then grabbed and squeezed Rochin by the neck, as well as shoving his fingers in Rochin's mouth as he attempted to eject the capsules. The deputies, unable to obtain the capsules, handcuffed and took Rochin to Angeles Emergency Hospital where he was strapped to an operating table and had a tube forcibly placed in his mouth and into his stomach and given an emetic solution, whereupon he vomited the capsules into a bucket. The deputies then retrieved the capsules and tested them to be morphine. Subsequently, this was submitted as evidence, and Rochin was found guilty of violating California Health and Safety Code § 11500 as having an unlawful possession of morphine.

Rochin appealed his case on the basis that his rights, guaranteed to him by Amendments V and XIV of the United States Constitution and by Article I(1)(13)(19) of the California Constitution rendered the evidence inadmissible, and that the forced stomach pumping was unconstitutionally compelled self-incrimination. The appeals court denied his defense arguing that the evidence was admissible, despite the egregious behavior of the officers, as it was "competent evidence", and the courts are not allowed to question the means in which it was obtained. As the court wrote, "illegally obtained evidence is admissible on a criminal charge in this state."

== Decision ==
The court voted in an 8–0 decision (Minton abstained) to overturn the decision. Justice Frankfurter wrote the majority opinion which struck down the prior conviction, arguing that the brutality of the means used to extract the evidence from Rochin "shocks the conscience", and it clearly violates the due process of law as guaranteed by the Fourteenth Amendment. Frankfurter also admitted the term "due process" was nebulous but asserted that it existed to preserve the fairness and integrity of the system and that society expects judges to act impartially and to take into account precedence and social context.

The court quoted from the decision of the California Supreme Court, in which two justices dissented, saying,

... a conviction which rests upon evidence of incriminating objects obtained from the body of the accused by physical abuse is as invalid as a conviction which rests upon a verbal confession extracted from him by such abuse. ... Had the evidence forced from defendant's lips consisted of an oral confession that he illegally possessed a drug ..., he would have the protection of the rule of law which excludes coerced confessions from evidence. But because the evidence forced from his lips consisted of real objects, the People of this state are permitted to base a conviction upon it. [We] find no valid ground of distinction between a verbal confession extracted by physical abuse and a confession wrested from defendant's body by physical abuse.

Justice Douglas and Black both wrote concurring opinions in which they argued that the lower court's decision should have been overturned based on the Fifth Amendment liberty from self-incrimination. Both justices believed that the 14th Amendment's guarantee of "due process" incorporated that right. The justices' opinions also offered much criticism of Frankfurter's opinion for the court.

Douglas rebuked the court for suddenly declaring that the exclusion of illegally obtained evidence, which had not been an issue up until then, suddenly violated the "decencies of civilized conduct". Black disagreed with the logic in the majority as being contradictory. He argued the opinion enabled the court to nullify the California state law of using illegal evidence based on due process because its application "shocks the conscience", but then admonishes judges to be impartial and use the society's standards in judgment.
