= Adam (given name) =

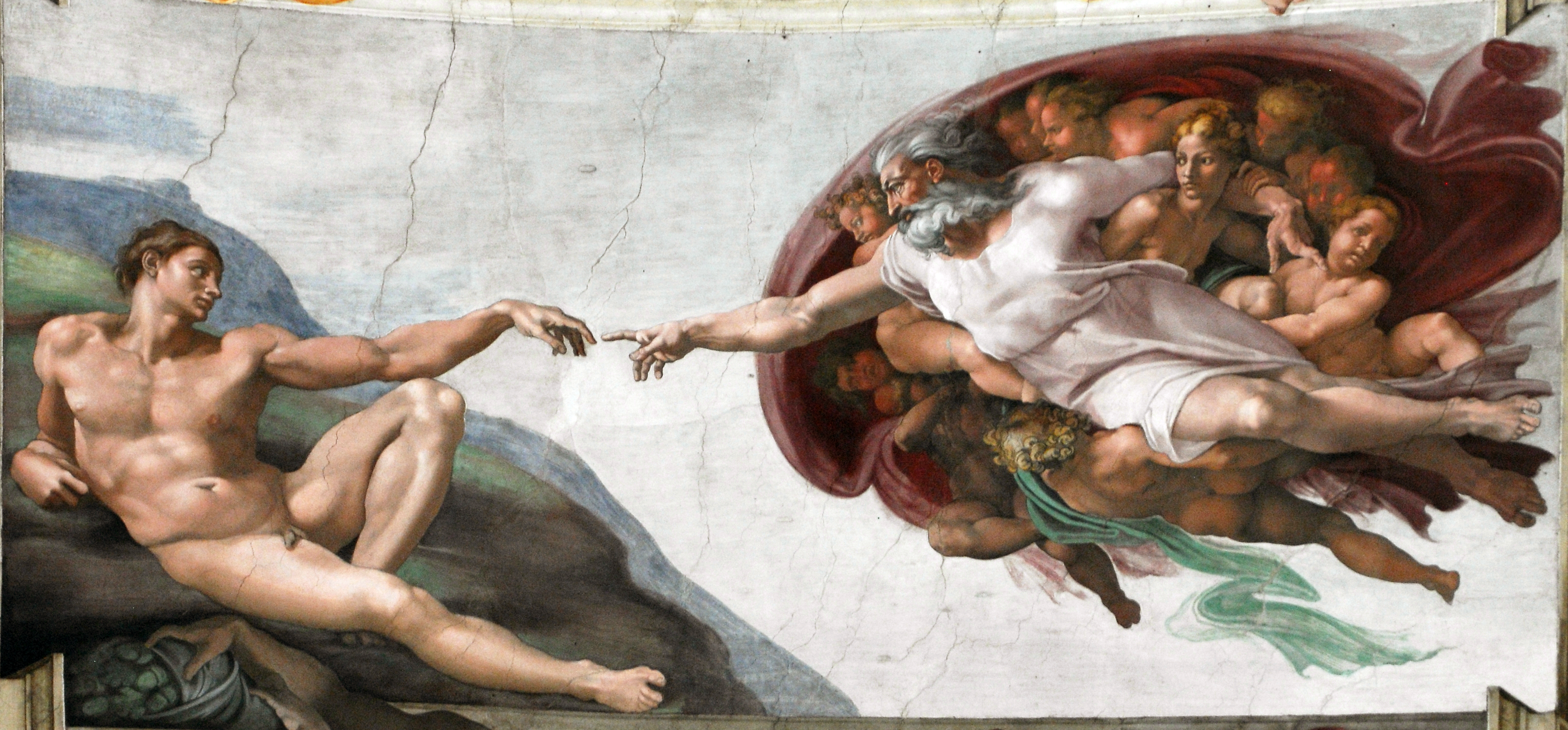
- Michelangelo's Creation of Adam, from the Sistine Chapel ceiling
- Pronunciation: /ˈædəm/
- Gender: Male
- Language: Hebrew, Aramaic, Akkadian, Arabic

Origin
- Meaning: "Earth" or "Soil"

Other names
- Nickname: Ad
- See also: Adan, Adão, Adem

Adam is a common masculine given name in the English language, of Hebrew origin.

The name derives from Adam (Hebrew: אָדָם), the first human according to the Hebrew Bible. When used as noun, אָדָם means "man" or "humanity". Contemporary scholarly research also proposes different parallels and possible origins for the name Adam.

Its Biblical and Quranic uses have ensured that it is a common name in countries which draw on these traditions, and it is particularly common in Christian and Muslim majority countries. In most languages, its spelling is the same, although the pronunciation varies. Adán and Adão are the Spanish and Portuguese forms, respectively.

Adam is also a surname in many countries, although it is not as common in English as its derivative Adams (sometimes spelt Addams). In other languages, there are similar surnames derived from Adam, such as Adamo, Adamov, Adamowicz, Adamski, McAdam, etc.

In Arabic, Adam (آدم) means "made from earth's mud".

== Translations ==
- Albanian: Adam, Adham, Adem
- Arabic: آدم (Adam)
- Armenian: Ադամ (Adam)
- Assyrian Neo-Aramaic: ܐܵܕ݂ܵܡ (ʾāḏām / Adam)
- Basque: Adame
- Belarusian: Адам (Adam)
- Bosnian: Adem
- Bulgarian: Адам (Adam)
- Chinese Simplified: 亚当 (Yàdāng)
- Chinese Traditional: 亞當 (Yàdāng)
- Croatian: Adam
- Czech: Adam
- Dutch: Adam
- Esperanto: Adamo
- Filipino: آدم (Adan)
- Finnish : Aadam, Aatami
- French: Adam
- German: Adam
- Greek: Αδάμ (Adám)
- Gujarati: આદમ (Ādama)
- Hausa: Adamu, Ado
- Hebrew: אדם (Adam)
- Hindi: आदम (Ādam)
- Hmong: Adas
- Hungarian: Ádám
- Indonesian: Adam
- Irish: Ádhamh
- Italian: Adamo
- Japanese: アダム (Adamu)
- Kannada: ಆಡಮ್ (Āḍam)
- Korean: 아담, 에덤 (Adam)
- Lao: ອາດາມ (Adam)
- Latin: Adamus
- Macedonian: Адам (Adam)
- Malayalam: അദം (Adam)
- Māori: Arama
- Mongolian: Адам (Adam)
- Nepali: आदम, romanized: Ādama
- Norwegian: Adam
- Persian: آدم (Ādam)
- Polish: Adam
- Portuguese: Adão
- Punjabi: ਆਦਮ (Ādama)
- Romanian: Adam
- Russian: Адам (Adam)
- Sumerian: 𒀀𒁕 (Adamu)
- Serbian: Adam, Adem
- Scottish Gaelic: Àdhamh
- Slovak: Adam
- Slovene: Adam
- Somali: Aadan
- Spanish: Adán
- Swahili: Adamu
- Tamil: ஆதாம் (Ātām)
- Telugu: ఆదాము (Ādaamu)
- Thai: อาดัม (Xādạm)
- Turkish: Adem
- Ukrainian: Адам
- Uzbek: Odam
- Vietnamese: Á Đàm
- Yiddish: Adi or Odem אדם אָדער אָדעם
- Yoruba: Ádámu

== People with the given name Adam ==
=== A ===
- Adam, the first man in Abrahamic religions
- Adam, Earl of Angus (fl. 1189), Scottish nobleman
- Adam of Acre, 11th-century bishop of Banias
- Adam of Bremen, 11th-century German chronicler
- Adam of Dryburgh (c. 1140 – c. 1212), Anglo-Scottish theologian and Carthusian monk
- Adam of Ebrach (died 1161), German abbot and historian
- Adam of Melrose (died 1222), Bishop of Caithness
- Adam (monk) (fl. 8th century), East Syriac Christian monk
- Adam (bishop of Ourense) (died 1173/74), Spanish clergy
- Adam, Count of Schwarzenberg (1583–1641), Brandenburg official during the Thirty Years' War
- Adam the Welshman (c. 1130–1181), Welsh theologian and Bishop of St Asaph
- Adam (murder victim) (c. 1990–2001), name given to the victim of an unsolved Thames murder case
- Adam Abeddou (born 1996), French footballer
- Adam Abell (c. 1480 – c. 1540), Scottish chronicler, friar at Jedburgh Abbey
- Adam Abraham von Gaffron und Oberstradam (1665–1738), member of the Gaffron noble family
- Adam Abramowicz (1710–1766), Polish Jesuit
- Adam Abu, Ghanaian politician
- Adam Acres (1878–1955), Canadian politician and farmer
- Adam Adamczyk (born 1950), Polish judoka
- Adam Adami (born 1992), Brazilian footballer
- Adam Adami (1603 or 1610–1663), German diplomat and priest
- Adam Adamowicz (1968–2012), American video game concept artist
- Adam Adamson (1884–1984), New Zealand businessman, accountant, and politician
- Adam Adler, British television executive producer
- Adam Adli (born 1989), Malaysian student activist
- Adam Adrio (1901–1973), German musicologist and college professor
- Adam Afriyie (born 1965), British politician
- Adam Afzelius (1750–1837), Swedish botanist
- Adam Agius, lead vocalist of the Australian progressive metal band Alchemist
- Adam Christian Agricola (1593–1645), Cieszyn evangelical preacher
- Adam Aitken (born 1960), Australian poet
- Adam Emory Albright (1862–1957), American painter
- Adam Alexander (born 1973), American sportscaster
- Adam Alexander (born 1998), American singer-songwriter known professionally as Demo Taped
- Adam Rankin Alexander (1781–1848), American politician
- Adam Alexi-Malle (born 1964), Italian actor, singer, dancer, and musician
- Adam Abdullah Al-Ilory (1917–1992), Benin-Nigerian Islamic scholar
- Adam All, British drag king, performer, and host
- Adam Allan (1904 – after 1937), Scottish footballer
- Adam Allouche (born 1993), French-Lebanese competitive swimmer
- Adam Almiliby, Portuguese businessman and tax collector
- Adam Almqvist (born 1991), Swedish ice hockey player
- Adam Alsing (1968–2020), Swedish television and radio host
- Adam Alter, American author and businessman
- Adam Amandi (1926–2006), Ghanaian educationist, farmer, environmentalist, and politician
- Adam d'Ambergau (15th century), Bavarian compositor
- Adam Amin (born 1986), American television and radio sportscaster
- Adam Amirilayev (born 1963), Russian politician
- Adam Ammour (born 2001), German bobsledder
- Adam Anders (born 1975), Swedish film, television, and music producer
- Adam Anderson (1692 or 1693–1765), Scottish economist, clerk in South Sea House
- Adam Anderson (1783–1846), Scottish physicist and encyclopedist
- Adam Anderson (born 1969), Australian tennis player
- Adam Anderson (born 1984), British musician
- Adam Anderson (born 1985), American monster truck driver
- Adam Anderson (born 1999), American college football player
- Adam Anderson, Lord Anderson (c. 1797–1853), Scottish judge
- Adam Andersson (born 1996), Swedish footballer
- Adam Andretti (born 1979), American racing driver
- Adam Andruszkiewicz (born 1990), Polish politician
- Adam Anhang (1973–2005), Canadian online gambling executive and murder victim
- Adam Ant (born 1954), English singer and actor, lead singer of Adam and the Ants
- Adam Antes (1891–1984), German sculptor and graphic artist
- Adam Apple (1831–1905), German-American immigrant, farmer, carpenter, and politician
- Adam Applegarth (born 1962), English banker, CEO of Northern Rock
- Adam Archibald (1879–1957), Scottish soldier and recipient of the Victoria Cross
- Adam Archuleta (born 1977), American football player
- Adam Arcuragi, American death gospel songwriter and musician
- Adam Ariel (born 1994), Israeli basketball player
- Adam Arkapaw, Australian cinematographer
- Adam Arkin (born 1956), American television, film, and stage actor and director
- Adam Armour (born 2002), American soccer player
- Adam Armstong (1788–1853), European settler
- Adam Armstrong (born 1997), English footballer
- Adam Alexander Armstrong (1909–1982), Australian politician, known as Bill Armstrong
- Adam Loftus Armstrong (1878–1959), New Zealand rugby union player
- Adam Arndtsen (1829–1919), Norwegian physicist and professor
- Adam Arnold (born 1981), American comic book creator
- Adam Aron (born 1954), American businessman
- Adam Arthur (born 1985), English footballer
- Adam Asghar (born 1994), Scottish footballer and coach
- Adam Ashburnham, English politician
- Adam Ashe (born 1993), Scottish rugby union player
- Adam Ashley-Cooper (born 1984), Australian rugby union player
- Adam Asnyk (1838–1897), Polish poet, dramatist and freedom fighter
- Adam Assimi, Beninese middle-distance runner
- Adam Astill, English actor
- Adam Aston (1902–1993), Polish singer, actor and pianist
- Adam Atkinson (born 1967), English priest
- Adam Auckland (born 1993), English squash player
- Adam Austin (1911–1970), Scottish rugby union referee
- Adam Austin (1926–2011), pseudonym used by American comic book artist Gene Colan
- Adam Averell (1754–1847), Irish primitive Wesleyan clergy
- Adam Ayles (1850–1912), English Arctic explorer
- Adam Azimov, Canadian film director

=== B ===
- Adam Babah-Alargi (1927–2019), Ghanaian engineer
- Adam Baboulas (born 1987), Canadian football player
- Adam Bacher (born 1973), South African cricketer
- Adam Bachmann (1890–1966), Estonian politician
- Adam Back (born 1970), British cryptographer, cypherpunk, and businessman
- Adam Badeau (1831–1895), American author, Union Army officer, and diplomat
- Adam Bagni (born 1984), American journalist and sportscaster
- Adam Bahdaj (1918–1985), Polish translator and writer
- Adam Bahdanovič (1862–1940), Belarusian ethnographer and folklore historian
- Adam Yuki Baig (born 1999), Japanese handball player
- Adam Bailey (born 1989), English footballer and coach
- Adam Leitman Bailey (born 1970), American lawyer
- Adam Bajalics von Bajahaza (1734–1800), Austrian soldier
- Adam Baker (born 1993), English footballer
- Adam Baker, lead vocalist and founder of the American indie band Annuals
- Adam Baker, English entrepreneur and founder of the website Blottr
- Adam J. Baker (1821–1912), Canadian politician
- Adam Bakoune (born 2006), Polish-Italian footballer
- Adam Bakri (born 1988), Palestinian actor
- Adam Balding (born 1979), English rugby union player
- Adam Baldridge (1690–1697), English pirate and settler
- Adam Baldwin (born 1962), American actor
- Adam Baldwin (born 1986), Canadian indie rock singer-songwriter
- Adam Bałdych (born 1986), Polish violinist, composer, and music producer
- Adam Ball (born 1993), English cricketer
- Adam Ballinger (born 1979), American-Australian basketball player
- Adam Ballou (born 1992), American soccer player
- Adam Bamme (died 1397), English goldsmith and politician
- Adam Banasiak (born 1989), Polish footballer
- Adam Banaś (born 1982), Polish footballer
- Adam Bandt (born 1972), Australian Green politician and industrial lawyer
- Adam Banton (born 1975), American freestyle BMX rider, musician, and businessman
- Adam Barclay (born 1970), Australian bobsledder
- Adam Bareiro (born 1996), Paraguayan footballer
- Adam Bargielski (1903–1942), Polish Roman Catholic priest
- Adam Bark (born 2000), Swedish footballer
- Adam Barr, American television screenwriter and producer
- Adam Barrett (born 1979), English footballer
- Adam Barrett (born 1992), English swimmer
- Adam Barry (born 1981), English musician
- Adam Barta (born 1979), American actor, reality star, and musician
- Adam Bartlett (born 1986), English goalkeeper
- Adam Bartley (born 1979), American actor
- Adam Barton (born 1991), English footballer
- Adam Barton (born 1995), English cricketer
- Adam Bartoš (born 1992), Czech volleyball player
- Adam Bartsch (1757–1821), Austrian scholar and artist
- Adam Baruch (1945–2008), Israeli journalist, newspaper editor, writer, and art critic
- Adam Barwood (born 1992), New Zealand alpine skier
- Adam Basanta (born 1985), Canadian artist and experimental composer
- Adam Basil (born 1975), Australian track and field athlete
- Adam Bass (born 1981), American baseball player
- Adam Bassett, British lighting designer
- Adam Batirov (born 1985), Russian-Bahraini freestyle wrestler
- Adam II. Batthyány (1662–1703), Hungarian general and noble
- Adam Baumann (1948–2021), Polish actor
- Adam Baworowski (1913–1943), Austrian-Polish tennis player
- Adam Bayliss (born 1979), Australian film producer
- Adam Baynes (1622–1671), English Army officer
- Adam Beach (born 1972), Canadian Saulteaux actor
- Adam Beales (born 1999), Irish YouTuber, actor, and television host known professionally as Adam B.
- Adam Beard (born 1996), Welsh rugby union player
- Adam Beashel (fl. 1999–2009), Australian sailor
- Adam Beattie (1833–1893), American politician
- Adam Beaumont (born 1972), English businessman, angel investor, trustee, and digital entrepreneur
- Adam Beck (1857–1925), Canadian politician
- Adam Becker (born 1984), American astrophysicist, author, and scientific philosopher
- Adam Beckett (1950–1979), American animator, special effects artist, and teacher
- Adam Beckman (born 2001), Canadian ice hockey player
- Adam Bedell (born 1991), American soccer player
- Adam Beechen (born 1954), American comic book writer
- Adam Beechey (born 1981), Australian racing driver
- Adam Beeler (1879–1947), American politician
- Adam Begley (born 1959), American freelance writer and editor
- Adam Bełcikowski (1839–1909), Polish philosopher, historian, poet, and dramaturg
- Adam Bell, English outlaw
- Adam Carr Bell (1847–1912), Canadian politician
- Adam Bellenden (1569–1647), Scottish Bishop
- Adam Bellow, American executive editor
- Adam Ingi Benediktsson (born 2002), Icelandic footballer
- Adam Benisz (1888–1991), Polish Army officer
- Adam Benjamin, American jazz keyboardist and composer
- Adam Benjamin Jr. (1935–1982), American politician
- Adam Bennett (born 1971), Canadian ice hockey player
- Adam S. Bennion (1886–1958), American politician and businessman
- Adam Bentick (born 1985), Australian rules footballer
- Adam Benzine, British filmmaker and journalist
- Adam Berdichevsky (born 1983), Israeli Paralympic wheelchair tennis player
- Adam Berg (1540–1610), German printer and publisher
- Adam Berg (born 1972), Swedish director and writer
- Adam Bergen (born 1983), American football player
- Adam Bergendahl (born 1994), Swedish ice hockey player
- Adam Berger (born 1990), Canadian football player
- Adam Bergman (born 1980), American cyclist
- Adam Bergqvist (born 1993), Swedish ice hockey player
- Adam Berinsky (born 1970), American political science professor
- Adam Berkhoel (born 1981), American ice hockey goaltender
- Adam J. Bernard (born 1988), British actor and singer
- Adam Berner (born 1987), Swedish footballer
- Adam Bernero (born 1976), American baseball pitcher
- Adam Bernstein (born 1960), American director
- Adam Berry (born 1966), American television and film composer
- Adam Berry (born 1992), Irish cricketer
- Adam Berry (born 1997), Australian footballer
- Adam K. Bert (1905–2007), American philatelist
- Adam Berti (born 1986), Canadian ice hockey player
- Adam Bertocci (born 1982), American filmmaker
- Adam Bessa (born 1992), French-Tunisian actor
- Adam Best (born 1982), Irish actor
- Adam Beveridge (1826–1907), Scottish-Canadian merchant and political figure
- Adam Beyer (born 1976), Swedish techno producer and DJ
- Adam Bice (born 1989), American football player
- Adam Biddle (born 1988), Australian footballer
- Adam Bielan (born 1974), Polish politician
- Adam Bielański (1912–2016), Polish chemist and professor
- Adam Bielecki (born 1983), Polish alpine and high-altitude climber
- Adam Bighill (born 1988), American gridiron football player
- Adam Billaut (1602–1662), French carpenter, poet, and singer
- Adam Bilzerian (born 1983), American-Nevisian poker player and writer
- Adam Lewis Bingaman (1793–1869), American politician
- Adam Birch (born 1979), American professional wrestler, known as Joey Mercury or Joey Matthews
- Adam Birchall (born 1984), English footballer and coach
- Adam Bird (born 1969), American politician
- Adam Birnbaum (born 1979), American jazz pianist, composer, and arranger
- Adam Biro, Hungarian publisher and author
- Adam Birtwistle (born 1959), British artist
- Adam Bischof (born 1915, date of death unknown), Austrian field hockey player
- Adam Bishop (born 1989), English strongman
- Adam Bisnowaty (born 1993), American football player
- Adam Bittleston (1817–1892), British-Indian judge
- Adam Bizanski (born 1983), Israeli writer, director, and animator
- Adam Black (1784–1874), Scottish publisher and politician
- Adam Black (1839–1902), Australian politician
- Adam Black (1898–1981), Scottish-born footballer
- Adam Black (born 1975), English rugby union player
- Adam Black (born 1992), English footballer
- Adam Blacklaw (1937–2010), Scottish goalkeeper
- Adam Blackley (born 1985), Australian baseball player
- Adam Blackstone (born 1982), American multi-instrumentalist, songwriter, producer, and bassist
- Adam Blackwell, Canadian diplomat
- Adam Blackwood (1539–1613), Scottish author and apologist
- Adam Blackwood (born 1959), English actor
- Adam Blair (born 1986), New Zealand rugby league footballer
- Adam Johnston Fergusson Blair (1815–1867), Scottish-Canadian lawyer, judge, and politician
- Adam Blake (born 1976), English producer, musician, and songwriter
- Adam Blakeman (1596–1665), English clergyman and migrant
- Adam Blakeman (born 1991), English footballer
- Adam Bland (born 1982), Australian golfer
- Adam Blatner (1937–2021), American psychologist, psychology theorist, and author
- Adam Bleakney, American Paralympic track and field athlete
- Adam Block (1951–2008), American writer and music critic
- Adam Block (born 1973), American astrophotographer, astronomy researcher, writer and instructor
- Adam Bloom (born 1970), British comedian and writer
- Adam Blumenthal, American businessman and private equity firm executive
- Adam Blyth (born 1981), Australian golfer
- Adam Blythe (born 1989), English racing cyclist
- Adam Bob (1967–2019), American football player
- Adam Bock, Canadian playwright
- Adam Bodnar (born 1977), Polish lawyer, educator, and human rights activist
- Adam Bodzek (born 1985), German-Polish footballer
- Adam S. Boehler (born 1979), American businessman and politician
- Adam Bogardus (1834–1913), American trap shooter
- Ádám Bogdán (born 1987), Hungarian footballer
- Adam Bogdanove (born 1964), American scientist and professor
- Adam Bogle (1848–1915), British soldier and footballer
- Adam Bogosavljević (1843–1880), Serbian politician and farmer
- Adam Bohling, British film producer
- Adam Bohorič (1520–1598), Slovene preacher, teacher, and author
- Adam Boland (born 1977), Australian television producer and director
- Adam Bolder (born 1980), English footballer
- Adam Bomb (musician) (born 1963), American guitarist and singer
- Adam Bomb (born 1964), American wrestler whose real name is Bryan Clark
- Adam Bombolé (born 1957), Congo politician
- Adam Booth (born 1994), British boxing trainer
- Adam Boqvist (born 2000), Swedish ice hockey player
- Adam Boreel (1602–1665), Dutch theologian and scholar
- Adam Boryczka (1913–1988), Polish Army Captain
- Adam Borzęcki (born 1978), Polish-German ice hockey player
- Adam Bosworth, American businessman and software engineer
- Adam Botana (born 1984), American politician
- Adam Botbyl, American computer hacker
- Adam Botek (born 1997), Slovak sprint canoeist
- Adam Bothwell (1527–1593), Scottish clergyman, judge, and politician
- Adam Bouchard (born 1996), Canadian soccer player
- Adam Boujamaa (born 1998), French footballer
- Adam Boulton (born 1959), British journalist and broadcaster
- Adam Bousdoukos (born 1974), German actor
- Adam Bouska (born 1983), American fashion photographer
- Adam Bouzid (born 1987), French-Algerian footballer
- Adam Giede Böving (1869–1957), Danish-American entomologist and zoologist
- Adam Bowden (born 1982), British triathlete and runner
- Adam Bowen (born 1974/1975), American businessman
- Adam Bowman (1880–1937), Scottish footballer
- Adam Box, American drummer for the country duo Brothers Osborne
- Adam Boyd (1746–1835), American politician and enslaver
- Adam Boyd (born 1982), English footballer
- Adam Boyes (born 1990), English footballer
- Adam Brace (born 1980), British playwright
- Adam Bradbury (born 1991), English volleyball player
- Adam Bradley (born 1961), American politician
- Adam Bradley (born 1974), American literary critic, professor, and writer
- Adam Braidwood (born 1984), Canadian professional boxer, actor, martial artist, and football player
- Adam Brand (1692–1746), German merchant and explorer
- Adam Brand (singer) (born 1970), Australian country singer
- Adam Braver (born 1963), American author
- Adam L. Braverman (born 1975), American politician
- Adam Bravin, American musician and producer known professionally as DJ Adam 12
- Adam Braz (born 1981), Canadian soccer player
- Adam Breneman (born 1995), American football player and political operative
- Adam Brenkus (born 1999), Slovak footballer
- Adam Brideson (born 1981), Australian rugby league footballer
- Adam Bridle (born 1987), professional wrestler, known as Angélico
- Adam Bright (born 1984), Australian baseball pitcher
- Adam Briscomb, Australian actor
- Adam Bristow (born 1973), Australian rugby league footballer
- Adam Brocklebank (born 1995), English rugby union player
- Adam Brodecki (figure skater) (1949–2010), Polish paediatrician, politician, and competitive pair skater
- Adam Brodecki (born 1995), Swedish ice hockey player
- Adam Brodsky, American anti-folk singer
- Adam Brody (born 1979), American actor, writer, and musician
- Adam Brodzisz (1906–1986), Polish actor
- Adam Bromberg (1912–1993), Polish publisher and politician
- Adam Bronikowski (born 1978), Polish rower
- Adam Brook, American thoracic surgeon
- Adam Brookes (born 1963), Canadian-British-American novelist and journalist
- Adam Brooks (disambiguation), several people
- Adam Broomberg (born 1970), English artist
- Adam Brown (1826–1926), Canadian politician and merchant
- Adam Brown (1920–1960), Scottish-Canadian hockey player
- Adam Brown (born 1980), English actor, comedian, and pantomime performer
- Adam Brown (born 1981), American music educator
- Adam Brown (born 1986), American politician
- Adam Brown (born 1987), Welsh rugby union player
- Adam Brown (born 1989), British freestyle swimmer
- Adam Brown (born 1995), Scottish footballer
- Adam Brown of Blackford (1660–1711), Scottish merchant and Lord Provost of Edinburgh
- Adam M. Brown (1826–1901), American politician
- Adam Browne (born 1963), Australian science fiction writer and illustrator
- Sir Adam Browne, 2nd Baronet (c. 1626–1690), royalist commander in the English Civil War
- Adam Broż (born 1935), Polish art historian and journalist
- Adam Bruce (born 1968), Scottish solicitor, businessman, and aristocrat
- Adam Buck (1759–1833), Irish neo-classical portraitist and miniature painter and engraver
- Adam Buckingham (born 1988), British acrobatic gymnast
- Adam Buckley (born 1979), English footballer
- Adam Buddle (1662–1715), English cleric and botanist
- Adam Budnikowski (born 1948), Polish economist
- Adam Bugajski (born 1974), Polish civil servant and politician
- Adam Buick (born 1944), English socialist and politician
- Adam Buksa (born 1996), Polish footballer
- Adam Burakowski (born 1977), Polish diplomat, politician, political scientist, and historian
- Adam Burdett (1882–1918), South African rugby union player
- Adam Burgess (born 1992), British slalom canoeist
- Adam Burish (born 1983) American ice hockey player
- Adam Burke (1971–2018), Irish ocean rower
- Adam Burke (born 1976), American stand-up comedian, writer, and comic artist
- Adam Burkhammer, American politician and pastor
- Adam Burley (died 1327/1328), English philosopher
- Adam Burrows, American astrophysical scientist and professor
- Adam Burski (ca. 1560–1611), Polish philosopher
- Adam Burt (born 1969), American ice hockey player
- Adam Burton (born 1972), Australian baseball player
- Adam Prosper Burzyński (1755–1830), Roman Catholic bishop and missionary
- Adam Busby (born 1948), Scottish convicted terrorist, malicious hoaxer, and politician
- Adam Busch (born 1978), American actor, film director, and singer
- Adam Buszko (born 1975), Polish musician, vocalist, composer, and multi-instrumentalist known professionally as ATF Sinner
- Adam Butcher (born 1988), Canadian actor
- Adam Butler (1931–2008), British politician
- Adam Butler (born 1972), English electronic music record producer known professionally as Vert
- Adam Butler (born 1973), American baseball pitcher
- Adam Butler (born 1994), American football player
- Adam Buxton (born 1969), British actor, comedian, podcaster, and writer
- Adam Buxton (born 1992), English footballer
- Adam Bygrave (born 1989), English footballer
- Adam Byram (born 1971), English cricketer
- Adam M. Byrd (1859–1912), American politician
- Adam Byrne (born 1994), Irish rugby union player
- Adam Byrnes (born 1981), Australian immigration lawyer
- Adam Bysouth (born 1979), Canadian lacrosse player and coach

=== C ===
- Adam Cadre (born 1974), American writer
- Adam Calhoun (born 1980), American rapper, singer, songwriter, and comedian
- Adam Campbell (born 1980), English actor
- Adam Campbell (born 1985), New Zealand Australian rules footballer
- Adam Campbell (born 1995), English footballer
- Adam Capay (born 1993), Canadian murderer
- Adam Caporn (born 1982), Australian basketball player and coach
- Adam Cappa (born 1985), American contemporary Christian and rock singer-songwriter
- Adam Carlén (born 2000), Swedish footballer
- Adam Carmer (born 1966), American entrepreneur, professor, and author
- Adam Carolla (born 1964), American comedian
- Adam Carriker (born 1984), American football player
- Adam Carroll (born 1975), American musician
- Adam Carroll (born 1982), Northern Irish racing driver
- Adam Carse (1878–1958), English composer, academic, songwriter, and editor
- Adam Carson (died 1935), Scottish footballer
- Adam Carson (born 1975), drummer of the American alternative rock band AFI
- Adam Carter (born 1994), Australian rules footballer
- Adam Casad (1879–1927), American football player and U.S. Army Officer
- Adam Casey (born 1986), Australian footballer
- Adam Casey (born 1989), Canadian curler
- Adam Castillejo, Second person to be cured of HIV infection, nicknamed "The London Patient"
- Adam Cayton-Holland (born 1980), American stand-up comedian, writer, and podcaster
- Adam Cerra (born 1999), Australian rules footballer
- Adam Cesare (born 1988), American author
- Adam Chadaj (born 1984), Polish tennis player
- Adam Chamberlain (born 1972), English author
- Adam Chambers (born 1980), English footballer
- Adam Chambers, Canadian politician
- Adam Chanler-Berat (born 1986), American stage and film director and singer
- Adam Chapman (born 1989), Northern Irish footballer
- Adam Chartoi (born 1997), Swedish boxer
- Adam Chase (1928–2008), pseudonym used by American author, Stephen Marlowe
- Adam Chase, writer and television producer
- Adam Chatfield (born 1979), Australian rules footballer
- Adam Chazen (born 1986), American special effects producer
- Adam Chen (born 1976), Singaporean television and film actor, born Zhān Jīnquán
- Adam Cheng (born 1947), Hong Kong actor and singer
- Adam Chennoufi (born 1988), Swedish footballer
- Adam Chętnik (1885–1967), Polish ethnographer
- Adam Cheyer (born c. 1966), American businessman
- Adam Chicksen (born 1991), English footballer
- Adam Chlapík (born 1994), Czech ice hockey player
- Adam Chodzko (born 1965), British contemporary artist
- Adam Choice (born 1995), American football player
- Adam Chowaniec (1950–2015), Canadian engineer, entrepreneur, and educator
- Adam Christie, Canadian stand-up comedian
- Adam Christing, American comedian, author, and motivational speaker
- Adam Christodoulou (born 1989), British racing driver
- Adam Christopher (born 1978), New Zealand novelist
- Adam Chromý (born 1988), Czech orienteering competitor
- Adam Chrzanowski (born 1999), Polish footballer
- Adam Chubb (born 1981), American basketball player
- Adam Cianciarulo (born 1996), American motocross and supercross racer
- Adam Cichon (born 1975), German footballer
- Adam Cieślar (born 1992), Polish Nordic combined skier
- Adam Cieśliński (born 1982), Polish footballer
- Adam Cifu, American physician, academic, author, and researcher
- Adam Cimber (born 1990), American baseball pitcher
- Adam Ciołkosz (1901–1978), Polish scout, soldier, publicist, and politician
- Adam G. Ciongoli (born 1968), American lawyer
- Adam Ciralsky (born 1971), American journalist, television and film producer, and attorney
- Adam Clapham (1940–2022), British television director and producer.
- Adam Clark (1811–1866), Scottish civil engineer
- Adam Clark, American meteorologist
- Adam Christian Clark (born 1980), American film director
- Adam Clarke (1762–1832), British Methodist theologian and biblical scholar
- Adam Clarke (born 1981), English cricketer
- Adam Clarke (born 1984), English cricketer
- Adam Clawson (1972–2017), American slalom canoeist
- Adam Clay (born 1990), English rugby league footballer
- Adam Clayton (born 1960), bass player in U2
- Adam Clayton (born 1989), English professional footballer
- Adam Clendening (born 1992), American ice hockey player
- Adam Cleveland, American politician
- Adam C. Cliffe (1869–1928), American politician
- Adam Clift (born 1962), British rower
- Adam Clune (born 1995), Australian rugby league footballer
- Adam Clydsdale (born 1993), Australian rugby league footballer
- Adam Clymer (1937–2018), American journalist
- Adam Coakley (born 1987), Scottish footballer
- Adam Cockburn, Australian actor
- Adam Cockburn, Lord Ormiston (1656–1735), Scottish administrator, politician, and judge
- Adam Cockie (born 1989), Australian rules footballer
- Adam Cockshell (born 1986), Australian rules footballer
- Adam Cohen (born c. 1962), American journalist, author, lawyer, and editor
- Adam Cohen (born 1972), Canadian musician, frontman of the band Low Millions
- Adam Cohen (born 1979), American chemist and professor
- Adam Cole (born 1974), English cricketer
- Adam Cole (Austin Jenkins) (born 1989), American professional wrestler
- Adam Coleman (born 1991), Australian rugby union player
- Adam Collin (born 1984), English goalkeeper
- Adam Collins (born 1984), Australian journalist and sports broadcaster
- Adam Collis, American filmmaker and actor
- Adam Colonia (1634–1685), Dutch painter
- Adam Commens (born 1976), Australian field hockey player and coach
- Adam Comorosky (1905–1951), American baseball player
- Adam Comrie (1990–2020), Canadian-American ice hockey player
- Adam Comstock (1740–1819), American soldier and politician
- Adam Conley (born 1990), American baseball pitcher
- Adam Connelly (born 1979), Australian rugby league footballer
- Adam Connolly (born 1986), English footballer
- Adam Conover (born 1983), American comedian, writer, voice actor, and television host
- Adam Contessa (born 1976), Australian rules footballer
- Adam Contzen (1571–1635), German Jesuit economist and exegete
- Adam Cook (1977–2008), New Zealand rugby league player
- Adam Cook (cricketer) (born 1979), English cricketer
- Adam Cook (rugby league, born 2000) (born 2000), Australian rugby league player
- Adam Cooley, American artist
- Adam Coombes (born 1991), English footballer
- Adam Coon (born 1994), American wrestler and football player
- Adam Cooney (born 1985), Australian rules footballer
- Adam Cooper (born 1971), English actor, choreographer, dancer, and theatre director
- Adam Coote, Australian rules football umpire and sprinter
- Adam Copeland (born 1973), Canadian pro wrestler best known as Edge
- Adam E. Cornelius (1882–1953), American businessman
- Adam Cornford (born 1950), British poet, journalist, and essayist
- Adam Cost, American graffiti artist known professionally as Cost
- Adam Courchaine (born 1984), Canadian ice hockey player
- Adam Cox (born 1986), British artistic gymnast
- Adam Cozad, American screenwriter
- Adam Crabb (born 1984), Australian baseball pitcher
- Adam Cracknell (born 1985), Canadian ice hockey player
- Adam Craig (cyclist) (born 1981), American mountain biker
- Adam Craig (runner) (born 1995), British long-distance runner
- Adam Craig (singer), American country music singer-songwriter
- Adam Creedy, English politician
- Adam Creighton (ice hockey) (born 1965), Canadian ice hockey player
- Adam Creighton, Australian journalist
- Adam Cristman (born 1985), American soccer player
- Adam Croasdell (born 1976), Zimbabwean-British actor
- Adam Croft, English writer
- Adam Crookes (born 1997), English footballer
- Adam Crooks (1824–1874), Wesleyan Methodist minister
- Adam Crooks (1827–1885), Canadian politician
- Adam Brown Crosby (1856–1921), Canadian politician
- Adam Crosswhite (1799–1878), American escaped slave
- Adam Crosthwaite (born 1984), Australian cricketer
- Adam Crouch (born 1972), Australian politician
- Adam Crozier (born 1964), Scottish businessman
- Adam Crusius (died 1608), German diplomat
- Adam Cruz, American jazz drummer
- Adam Crystal, American composer, violinist, and keyboardist
- Adam Cullen (1965–2012), Australian artist
- Adam Cummins (born 1993), English footballer
- Adam Cunnington (born 1987), English footballer
- Adam Curle (1916–2006), British academic
- Adam Curry (born 1964), original MTV VJ
- Adam Curtis (born 1955), English filmmaker
- Adam S. G. Curtis (1934–2017), British cell biologist
- Adam Cusack (c. 1630–1681), Irish landowner, barrister, and judge
- Adam Cushing (born 1980), American football coach
- Adam Cushman (born 1974), American film director, producer, screenwriter, and author
- Adam Cuthbertson (born 1985), Australian rugby league player
- Adam Cvijanovic (born 1960), American painter
- Adam Cwalina (born 1985), Polish badminton player
- Adam Cwejman (born 1985), Swedish politician
- Adam Cyra (born 1949), Polish historian
- Adam Sędziwój Czarnkowski (1555–1628), Polish nobleman
- Adam Jerzy Czartoryski (1770–1861), Polish-Lithuanian prince
- Adam Karol Czartoryski (born 1940), Polish-Spanish aristocrat
- Adam Kazimierz Czartoryski (1734–1823), Polish writer and statesman
- Adam Ludwik Czartoryski (1872–1937), Polish nobleman, landowner, and patron of the arts
- Adam Czerkas (born 1984), Polish footballer
- Adam Czerniaków (1880–1942), Polish-Jewish engineer and senator

=== D ===
- Adam D'Angelo (born 1984), American internet entrepreneur
- Adam D'Apuzzo (born 1986), Australian footballer
- Adam D'Arcy, Irish rugby union player
- Adam D'Zurilla (born 1981), American musician
- Adam Dahlberg (born 1993), American YouTuber
- Adam Dale (born 1968), Australian cricketer
- Adam Dalgleish (1868–1938), Scottish rugby union player
- Adam Damlip (died 1540s), English martyr
- Adam Danch (born 1987), Polish footballer
- Adam Daniel, American actor
- Adam Danielewicz (1846–1935), Polish statistician
- Adam Dant (born 1967), British artist
- Adam Darius (1930–2017), American dancer, mime artist, writer, and choreographer
- Adam Darr (1811–1866), German classical guitarist, singer, zither player, and composer
- Adam Darragh (born 1979), Australian basketball player
- Adam Darski (born 1977), Polish musician and television personality, known by the stage name Nergal
- Adam Davidson (1929–2007), Scottish footballer
- Adam Davidson (born 1964), American actor and television director
- Adam Davidson (born 1970), American journalist
- Adam Davidson (born 1983), American tennis player
- Adam Davies (born 1971), American author
- Adam Davies (born 1980), Welsh cricketer
- Adam Davies (born 1987), English-Welsh footballer
- Adam Davies (born 1992), German football goalkeeper
- Adam Davis, Australian rules football umpire
- Adam Davis, English pool player
- Adam 'Tex' Davis (fl. 1997–2005), American screenwriter and director
- Adam Dawson (1793–1873), Scottish distiller
- Adam Dawson (born 1992), English footballer
- Adam Dawson, English colonial administrator
- Adam Alexander Dawson (1913–2010), British film and television editor
- Adam Day, American poet and critic
- Adam Deacon (born 1983), English actor, rapper, and writer
- Adam Deadmarsh (born 1975), Canadian-American professional ice hockey player
- Adam Dean, Australian sprint canoer
- Adam Deans (born 1988), Australian wheelchair basketball player
- Adam Jacot de Boinod (born 1960), British author
- Adam DeBus (1892–1977), German-American baseball player
- Adam Dechanel (born 1978), British author, illustrator, graphic designer, and producer
- Adam Dedio (1918–1947), Polish Army and Navy officer
- Adam DeGraide (born 1971), American businessman
- Adam Deibert (born 1976), American musician and voice actor
- Adam Deitch (born 1976), American record producer and drummer
- Adam Deja (born 1993), Polish footballer
- Adam Delimkhanov (born 1969), Russian politician
- Adam Dell (born 1970), American businessman
- Adam Demos (born 1985), Australian actor
- Adam Dennis (born 1985), Canadian-Italian ice hockey goaltender
- Adam Dennison (born 1997), Irish cricketer
- Adam Charles Gustave Desmazures (1818–1891), Canadian author and Catholic priest
- Adam Deutsch (born 1995), Swedish ice hockey player
- Adam DeVine, American comedian, writer, producer, actor, and voice actor
- Adam Devlin (born 1969), English musician, guitarist, and songwriter
- Adam Dewes (born 1996), English cricketer
- Adam Perez Diaz (1909–2010), American politician
- Adam Dibble (born 1991), English cricketer
- Adam Dickinson, Canadian poet
- Adam H. Dicky (1864–1925), Canadian author, scientist, and secretary
- Adam Diment (born 1943), English novelist
- Adam DiMichele (born 1985), American football player and coach
- Adam Dircksz (1500–1530), Dutch sculptor, real name unknown
- Adam DiVello, American television producer
- Adam Dixon (born 1986), English field hockey player
- Adam Dixon (born 1989), Canadian ice sledge player
- Adam Dlouhý (born 1994), Czech ice hockey player
- Adam Doboszyński (1904–1951), Polish Army soldier, writer, engineer, and social activist
- Adam Docker (born 1985), English footballer
- Adam Docker (born 1991), Australian rugby league player
- Adam Dodd (born 1993), English footballer
- Adam Dodek, Canadian professor and dean
- Adam Dolatowski (born 1957), Polish field hockey player
- Adam Doleac (born 1988), American country music singer-songwriter
- Adam Dollard des Ormeaux (1635–1660), French colonial soldier
- Adam Doneger (born 1980), American lacrosse player
- Adam Donovan (musician), Australian musician
- Adam Dorrel (born 1974), American football player and coach
- Adam Doueihi (born 1998), Lebanese rugby league player
- Adam Doughty (born 1958), English kora player, teacher, and maker
- Adam Doukas (1790–1860), Greek revolutionary and politician
- Adam Dowdy (born 1975), American baseball umpire
- Adam Dread (born 1963), American politician, attorney, and businessman
- Adam Drese (1620–1701), German composer, kapellmeister, and bass viol player
- Adam Drewnowski (born 1948), Polish professor and epidemiologist
- Adam Drgoň (born 1985), Slovak ice hockey player
- Adam Driggs (born 1965), American attorney, politician, and jurist
- Adam Driver (born 1983), American actor
- Adam Drucker (born 1977), American rapper, known by the stage name Doseone
- Adam Drummond (1679–1758), Scottish surgeon
- Adam Drummond (politician) (1713–1786), Scottish merchant, banker, and politician
- Adam Drummond, 17th Baron Strange (born 1953), English peer
- Adam Drury (born 1978), English footballer
- Adam Drury (born 1993), English footballer
- Adam Dubin (born 1964), American filmmaker
- Adam Duce (born 1972), American musician
- Adam Duda (born 1991), Polish footballer
- Adam Duffin (1841–1924), Irish unionist politician
- Adam Duffy (born 1989), English snooker player
- Adam Dugdale (born 1987), English footballer
- Adam Duggleby (born 1984), British cyclist
- Adam Duhe Jr. (born 1955), American football player, known as A.J. Duhe
- Adam Dulęba (1895–1944), Polish photographer and soldier, known under the pseudonym Góral
- Adam Duncan (born 1833, death date unknown), American Union Navy sailor
- Adam Duncan (1852–1940), Indian-English lawyer and cricketer
- Adam Duncan, 1st Viscount Duncan of Camperdown (1731–1804), British admiral
- Adam M. Duncan (1927–2000), American missionary and lawyer
- Adam Dunkels (born 1978), Swedish computer scientist, computer programmer, entrepreneur, and businessman
- Adam Dunn (born 1979), first baseman for the Chicago White Sox
- Adam Duritz (born 1964), American singer, musician, and film and record producer, frontman for rock band Counting Crows
- Adam Dutkiewicz (born 1977), lead guitarist for American metalcore band Killswitch Engage
- Adam Duvall (born 1988), American baseball player
- Adam Duvendeck (born 1981), American track cyclist
- Adam Dyczkowski (1932–2021), Polish Catholic bishop
- Adam Dykes (1976–2009), New Zealand-Canadian wrestler known professionally as Adam Firestorm
- Adam Dykes (born 1977), Australian rugby league footballer
- Adam Dziewonski (1936–2016), Polish-American geophysicist
- Adam Dźwigała (born 1995), Polish footballer

=== E ===
- Adam Fortunate Eagle (born 1929), Member of the Red Lake Band of Chippewa Indians
- Adam Earnheardt (born 1970), American academic, author, sports and communication researcher, and social media critic
- Adam Easton (1328/1338–1397), English Cardinal
- Adam Eaton (born 1977), American baseball pitcher
- Adam Eaton (born 1980), English footballer
- Adam Eaton (born 1988), American baseball player
- Adam Ebbin (born 1963), American politician
- Adam Eberle (1804–1832), German painter
- Adam Eckersley (born 1982), Australian singer, guitarist, and songwriter for the blues band Bluezone
- Adam Eckersley (born 1985), English footballer
- Adam Eckfeldt (1769–1852), American politician
- Adam Edelen (born 1974), American businessman, solar energy entrepreneur, and politician
- Adam Edelman (born 1991), American-Israeli Olympian athlete
- Adam Edström (born 2000), Swedish ice hockey player
- Adam Edwards (born 1980), American racing driver
- Adam Egede-Nissen (1868–1953), Norwegian postmaster and politician
- Adam Eggich, Slovenian politician
- Adam Eidinger (born 1973), American businessman and cannabis rights activist
- Adam El-Abd (born 1984), English footballer
- Adam Eli (born 1990), American activist and writer
- Adam Elias von Siebold (1775–1828), German gynaecologist
- Adam B. Ellick, American journalist
- Adam Elliot (died 1700), English clergyman and traveller
- Adam Elliot (1802–1878), British missionary
- Adam Elliot (born 1972), Australian stop-motion animation writer, director, and producer
- Adam Elliott (born 1994), Australian rugby union league player
- Adam Ellis, American webcomic artist
- Adam Ellis (born 1996), British grasstrack and speedway rider
- Adam Gibb Ellis, Chief Justice of Jamaica from 1884 to 1894
- Adam Elshaug (born 1974), Australian professor of health policy
- Adam Elsheimer (1578–1610), German painter
- Adam Emery (born 1962, declared dead 2004), American fugitive
- Adam Emmenecker (born 1985), American basketball player
- Adam Empie (1785–1860), American priest
- Adam Engel (born 1991), American baseball player
- Adam English (born 2003), Irish hurler
- Adam C. Engst (born 1967), American technology writer and publisher
- Adam Ennafati (born 1994), Moroccan footballer
- Adam Enright (born 1983), Canadian curler
- Adam Epler (1891–1965), Polish Army soldier
- Adam Erdmann Trčka von Lípa (1599–1634), Bohemian nobleman and soldier
- Adam Eriksson (born 1988), Swedish footballer
- Adam Eriksson (born 1990), Swedish footballer
- Adam Erne (born 1995), American ice hockey player
- Adam Erskine (died >1608), Scottish landowner and courtier
- Adam Etches (born 1991), British boxer
- Adam Eustace (born 1979), English rugby union footballer
- Adam Evans (born 1994), Irish footballer
- Adam Everett (born 1977), American professional baseball shortstop and third baseman
- Adam Exner (born 1928), Canadian Archbishop
- Adam Eyre (born 1978), American soccer player
- Adam Ben Ezra (born 1982), Israeli multi-instrumentalist, composer, and educator

=== F ===
- Adam Fairclough (historian) (born 1952), English historian
- Adam Faith (1940–2003), British teen idol and financial journalist
- Adam Falckenhagen (1697–1754), German lutenist and composer
- Adam Falk (born 1965), American businessman and physicist
- Adam Falkenstein (1906–1966), German Assyriologist
- Adam Falkner, American author, poet, artist, and educator
- Adam Farley (born 1980), English footballer
- Adam Farouk (born 1985), French footballer
- Adam Storey Farrar (1826–1905), English churchman and academic
- Adam Fastnacht (1913–1987), Polish historian and editor
- Adam Fathi (born 1957), Tunisian poet, translator, and lyric poet
- Adam Faucett, American singer-songwriter
- Adam Faul (1929–2016), Canadian boxer
- Adam Faulkner (born 1981), English swimmer
- Adam Fawer (born 1970), American novelist
- Adam Federici (born 1985), Australian goalkeeper
- Adam Fedoruk (born 1966), Polish footballer
- Adam Feeley (born 1977), American football player, known as A.J. Feeley
- Adam Feeney (born 1985), Australian tennis player
- Adam Felber, American political satirist, author, radio personality, actor, humorist, novelist, television writer, and comic book writer
- Adam Fellner (born 1993), Czech cross-country skier
- Adam Fenton (born 1972), English DJ and producer known professionally as Adam F
- Adam Ferency (born 1951), Polish actor
- Adam Fergus, Irish film, television, and stage actor
- Adam Ferguson (1723–1816), Scottish philosopher and historian
- Adam Ferguson (1770–1854), British Army Officer
- Adam Ferguson (born 1978), Australian photographer
- Adam Fergusson (1706–1785), Scottish minister
- Adam Fergusson (1783–1862), Canadian politician and farmer
- Adam Fergusson (born 1932), British journalist, author, and politician
- Sir Adam Fergusson, 3rd Baronet (1733–1813), Scottish advocate and politician
- Adam Johnston Fergusson Blair (1815–1867), Scottish-Canadian lawyer, judge, and politician
- Adam Ferrara (born 1966), American actor and comedian
- Adam Ferrie (1777–1863), Canadian businessman and politician
- Adam Ferziger (born 1964), American Jewish historian
- Adam Fetterman (born 1970), American attorney and politician
- Adam Feuerstein, American columnist and journalist in the biotechnology sector
- Adam Fforde (born 1953), English economist
- Adam Ficek (born 1974), English musician and psychotherapist
- Adam Fidusiewicz (born 1985), Polish actor
- Adam Fielding (born 1993), English actor
- Adam Fielding, British electronic music producer and composer
- Adam Fields, American executive, entrepreneur, and film and television producer
- Adam Fierro, American television writer and producer
- Adam Files (born 1993), English rugby league footballer
- Adam Filipczak (1915–1992), American basketball player
- Adam Finch (born 2000), English cricketer
- Adam Finch, British film editor
- Adam Finn, English paediatrician and professor
- Adam Fischer (1888–1968), Danish sculptor
- Ádám Fischer (born 1949), Hungarian conductor
- Adam Fisher, American baseball executive
- Adam FitzRoy (1307–1322), illegitimate son of King Edward II of England
- Adam Fitzgerald (born 1983), American poet
- Adam Fiut (1933–1966), Polish film and theater actor
- Adam Flagler (born 1999), American basketball player
- Adam Flash (born 1971), American professional wrestler whose real name is Douglas Adam Becker
- Adam Fleetwood, British racing driver
- Adam Fleischman (born 1969/1970), American restaurateur and businessman
- Adam Fleming (born 1948), British businessman
- Adam Fleming (born 1980), Scottish journalist and newscaster
- Adam Fleming, Scottish footballer
- Adam Fletcher (born 1983), Australian rugby league footballer
- Adam Fletcher, Canadian writer, speaker, and consultant
- Adam Flockhart (born 1945), Scottish badminton player
- Adam Flores (born 1970), Mexican-American boxer
- Adam Flowers, American opera singer
- Adam Fogerty (born 1969), English actor, boxer, and rugby league footballer
- Adam Fogt (born 1993), Danish futsal player and footballer
- Adam Fong (born 1980), American composer, performer, and producer
- Adam Font, Irish politician
- Adam Foote (born 1971), Canadian ice hockey player
- Adam Ford, British archaeologist
- Adam Forde (born 1982), Australian basketball coach
- Adam Forepaugh (1831–1890), American entrepreneur, businessman and circus owner
- Adam Forkner (born 1976), American musician and producer, known as White Rainbow
- Adam Foroughi, American businessman
- Adam Forshaw (born 1991), English footballer
- Adam Forster (1848–1928), German botanical illustrator and naturalist
- Adam Forsyth (born 1981), Australian boxer
- Adam Foti (born 1984), Australian footballer
- Adam Foulds (born 1974), British novelist and poet
- Adam Fousek (born 1994), Czech footballer
- Adam Fox (disambiguation), multiple people
- Adam Frączczak (born 1987), Polish footballer
- Adam Frampton (born 1980), American architect and educator
- Adam Frank (born 1962), American physicist, astronomer, and writer
- Adam Franklin, guitarist, singer, and songwriter, frontman of Swervedriver
- Adam Franz (1680–1732), 3rd Prince of Schwarzenberg
- Adam Fraser (1871 – after 1985), Scottish footballer
- Adam Frazier (born 1991), American baseball player
- Adam Freeland, English record producer and DJ
- Adam Freeman-Pask (born 1985), British rower
- Adam Freier (born 1980), Australian rugby union footballer
- Adam Frelin (born 1973), American artist, sculptor, photographer, and performer
- Adam Freytag (1608–1650), Polish engineer
- Adam Friedel (1780–1868), Danish soldier, philhellene, and buccaneer
- Adam Frizzell (born 1998), Scottish footballer
- Adam Froese (born 1991), Canadian field hockey player
- Adam Froman (born 1987), American football player
- Adam Frost (born 1969), British garden designer
- Adam Frost (born 1972), British author
- Adam Fry (born 1985), English footballer
- Adam Frye (born 1974), American soccer player
- Adam Fulara (born 1977), Polish guitarist
- Adam Fuller (born 1990), United States Virgin Islands footballer
- Adam Fuller, American football coach
- Adam Fullerton (born 1985), American lacrosse player
- Adam Kelso Fulton (1929–1994), Scottish rugby union player
- Adam Fuss (born 1961), British photographer

=== G ===
- Adam Gabriel (born 2001), Czech footballer
- Adam Gachet, American Baptist minister, also known as Adam Gashet
- Adam Yahiye Gadahn (né Pearlman) (born 1978), American spokesman for al-Qaeda
- Adam Gaiser, American scholar of Islamic studies
- Adam Galant (1954–2025), Polish hurdler
- Adam Galinsky (born 1969), American social psychologist
- Adam Blue Galli, American criminal, a part of the "Preppie Bandits"
- Adam Galos (1924–2013), Polish historian and professor
- Adam Gamoran (born 1957), American sociologist
- Adam Garcia (born 1973), Australian actor and tap dancer
- Adam Gardiner (disambiguation), several people
- Adam Gardner, lead guitarist for the rock band Guster
- Adam Garfinkle (born 1951), American historian, political scientist, and editor
- Adam Garton (born 1962), Australian rules footballer
- Adam Gase (born 1978), American football coach
- Adam Gatehouse (born c. 1950), English conductor, radio producer, and editor
- Adam Gaudette (born 1996), American ice hockey player
- Adam Gawlas (born 2002), Czech darts player
- Adam Gaynor (born 1963), American musician
- Adam Gazda (born 1987), American soccer player
- Adam Gazzaley (born 1968), American neuroscientist, author, photographer, entrepreneur, and inventor
- Adam Gdacius (1615–1688), Polish writer and Lutheran pastor
- Adam Geballe (born 1951), American microbiologist, scientist, and professor
- Adam Gee (born 1963), English interactive media and television producer and commissioner
- Adam Gee (born 1980), English golfer
- Adam Gee, Australian rugby league referee
- Adam Gemili (born 1993), British Olympic sprinter and footballer
- Adam Georgiev (born 1980), Czech poet and author
- Adam Germain, Canadian politician, lawyer, and judge
- Adam Gertler (born 1977/1978), American chef, television personality, and actor
- Adam Gerżabek (1898–1965), Polish painter
- Adam Gettis (born 1988), American football player
- Adam Giambrone (born 1977), Canadian politician
- Adam Gib (1714–1788), Scottish religious leader and minister
- Adam Gibbs, American voice actor
- Adam Gibson (born 1986), Australian basketball player
- Adam Gidwitz (born 1982), American author
- Adam Gierasch, American filmmaker, known as a part of a husband-and-wife duo with his wife, Jace Anderson
- Adam Gierek (born 1938), Polish politician
- Adam Gifford, Lord Gifford (1820–1887), Scottish advocate and judge
- Adam Gilchrist (born 1971), Australian cricketer
- Adam Giles (born 1973), Australian politician, Chief Minister of the Northern Territory from 2013 to 2016
- Adam Gillen (born 1985), British actor
- Adam Gillies, Lord Gillies (1760–1842), Scottish judge
- Adam Gilljam (born 1990), Swedish bandy player
- Adam Gimbel (1817–1896), Bavarian-American businessman
- Adam Ginning (born 2000), Swedish ice hockey player
- Adam Ginter, Polish sprint canoer
- Adam Girard de Langlade Mpali (born 2002), Gabonese swimmer
- Adam Gitsham (born 1978), Australian sports shooter
- Adam Scott Glancy, American author and game designer
- Adam Glapiński (born 1950), Polish economist and politician
- Adam Glass (born 1968), American comic book writer, screenwriter, and television producer
- Adam Glauer (1875–1945?), German occultist and spy, also known as Rudolf von Sebottendorf
- Adam Gledhill (born 1993), British rugby league footballer
- Adam Glen (1853–1937), New Zealand cricketer
- Adam John Glossbrenner (1810–1889), American politician
- Adam Gnade, American musician and author
- Adam Gnezda Čerin (born 1999), Slovenian footballer
- Adam Gock, Australian composer, creative director, and music entrepreneur
- Adam Godley (born 1964), English actor
- Adam Gold, American musician of the rock band The Mendoza Line
- Adam Goldberg (born 1970), American actor, director, producer and musician
- Adam Goldberg (born 1980), American football player
- Adam F. Goldberg (born 1976), American television and film producer and writer
- Adam Golde (died 1395/1396), English politician
- Adam Goldman (born 1973), American journalist
- Adam Samuel Goldman, American composer, music producer, and artist
- Adam Goldstein (1973–2009), American DJ and musician, known as DJ AM, member of rap rock band Crazy Town
- Adam Goldstein (born 1988), American author and businessman
- Adam Goldworm (born 1978), American literary and talent manager, film producer, and businessman
- Adam Goljan (born 2001), Slovak footballer
- Adam Gollner (born 1976), Canadian writer and musician
- Adam Gomez, American politician
- Adam Gondvi (1947–2011), Indian poet
- Adam Gontier (born 1978), musician and former lead singer of Canadian alternative rock band Three Days Grace
- Adam Gonšenica (born 1999), Slovak slalom canoer
- Adam Goode (born 1983), American politician
- Adam Goodes (born 1980), Australian rules football player
- Adam Goodheart, American historian, essayist, and author
- Adam Goodman, American film industry executive, television producer, and film producer
- Adam Gopnik (born 1956), American writer
- Adam Gordon (1831–1876), Canadian politician
- Adam Gordon of Auchindoun (1545–1580), Scottish soldier and knight
- Adam Lindsay Gordon (1833–1870), Australian poet, jockey and politician
- Lord Adam Gordon (1726–1801), Scottish career army officer
- Lord Adam Gordon (1909–1984), British royal courtier
- Adam Goren (born 1975), American musician, known professionally as Atom and His Package
- Adam Gorgoni (born 1963), American film and television composer
- Adam Gotsis (born 1992), Australian American football player
- Adam Goucher (born 1975), American cross-country and track and field runner
- Adam Stanisław Grabowski (1698–1766), Polish Bishop
- Adam Grace (born 1975), American author, magician, and musician, founder of the rock band Truth & Salvage Co.
- Adam Grad (1969–2015), Polish footballer
- Adam Graessle (born 1984), American football punter
- Adam Grahn (born 1984), Swedish rock singer, songwriter, guitarist, and frontman for the rock band Royal Republic
- Adam Granduciel, American singer and guitarist, frontman of The War on Drugs
- Adam Grant (born 1981), American popular science author and professor
- Adam Graves (born 1968), Canadian ice hockey player
- Adam Gray, American politician
- Adam Green (born 1975), American film director, producer, writer and actor
- Adam Green (born 1981), American musician
- Adam Green (born 1984), English footballer
- Adam Green, American theater critic and comedian
- Adam Greenberg (1937–2025), Polish-born Israeli-American cinematographer
- Adam Greenberg (born 1981), American baseball player
- Adam Greendale (born 1988), English rugby union player
- Adam Greenfield, American writer and urbanist
- Adam W. Greenway, American Southern Baptist ministers
- Adam Gregg (born 1983), American lawyer and politician
- Adam Gregory (born 1985), Canadian country singer-songwriter
- Adam Gregory (born 1987), American actor
- Adam Griffin (born 1984), English footballer
- Adam Griffith (born 1978), Australian cricketer
- Adam Griffith, American football placekicker
- Adam Griffiths (born 1979), Australian footballer
- Adam Griger (born 2004), Slovak footballer
- Adam Grinwis (born 1992), American soccer player
- Adam Gristick, American football coach
- Adam Remigiusz Grocholski (1888–1965), Polish Army Lieutenant Colonel
- Adam Gross (born 1986), English-Welsh footballer
- Adam Growe (born 1967), Canadian comedian, cab driver, and game show host
- Adam Gruca (1893–1983), Polish orthopaedist, inventor, and surgeon
- Adam Grzymała-Siedlecki (1876–1967), Polish literary and theater critic, playwright, translator, prose writer, and director
- Adam Grünewald (1902–1945), German SS officer and Nazi concentration camp commandant
- Adam Gubman (born 1979), American songwriter, arranger, and composer
- Adam Guettel (born 1964), American composer and lyricist
- Adam Gumpelzhaimer (1559–1625), Bavarian composer and music theorist
- Adam Gunn (1872–1935), Scottish-American decathlete
- Adam Gurowski (1805–1866), Polish-American author
- Adam Gussow (born 1958), American scholar, memoirist, and blues harmonica player
- Adam Gutstein, American businessman
- Adam Guziński (born 1970), Polish film director and screenwriter
- Adam Gwon, American composer and lyricist

=== H ===
- Adam Haayer (born 1977), American football player
- Adam Habib (born 1965), South African academic administrator
- Adam Hadwin (born 1987), Canadian golfer
- Adam Hagara (born 2006), Slovak figure skater
- Adam Hague (born 1997), English pole vaulter
- Adam Hałaciński (born 1962), Polish diplomat and former ambassador to Sweden
- Adam Halbur, American poet
- Adam Haldane-Duncan, 2nd Earl of Camperdown (1812–1867), British nobleman and politician
- Adam Hall (born 1980), American ice hockey player
- Adam Hall (born 1987), New Zealand para-alpine skier
- Adam Hall (born 1996), Scottish badminton player
- Adam Hall, pseudonym used by British novelist and playwright Elleston Trevor (1920–1995)
- Adam de la Halle (1237?–1288? or after 1306), French-born trouvère, poet and musician, also known as Adam le Bossu
- Adam Haluska (born 1983), American basketball player
- Adam Hamari (born 1983), American baseball umpire
- Adam Hambrick (born 1985), American country singer-songwriter
- Adam Hamdy (born 1974), British novelist, screenwriter, and film producer
- Adam Hamilton (New Zealand politician) (1880–1952), New Zealand politician, leader of the National Party
- Adam Hamilton (born 1964), American minister
- Adam Hamilton, American music producer, songwriter, and session musician
- Adam Hamm (born 1971), American politician, former North Dakota Insurance Commissioner
- Adam Hammill (born 1988), English footballer
- Adam Handling (born 1988), British chef and restaurateur
- Adam Hanft, American brand strategist, blogger, and copywriter
- Ádám Hanga (born 1989), Hungarian basketball player
- Adam Hanieh, British academic
- Adam Hann, lead guitarist of the English pop rock band The 1975
- Adam Hann-Byrd (born 1982), American actor and screenwriter
- Adam Hansen (born 1981), Australian road bicycle racer
- Adam Hanuszkiewicz (1924–2011), Polish actor and theatre director
- Adam Harasiewicz (born 1932), Polish classical concert pianist
- Adam Harding (born 1993), Welsh ice hockey player
- Adam Hardy (born 1953), British architect, historian, and professor
- Adam Hardy (born 1983), South African footballer
- Adam Hargreaves (born 1964), English author and illustrator
- Adam Harper, English mathematician and professor
- Adam Harper (born 1988), English professional boxer
- Adam Harrington (born 1978), American voice actor
- Adam Harrington (born 1980), American basketball player and coach
- Adam J. Harrington (born 1972), Canadian-American actor and producer
- Adam Harris (born 1975), American politician
- Adam Harris (born 1987), American sprinter
- Adam Harris (born 1994), Irish autism activist
- Adam Harrison (born 1985), Welsh cricketer
- Adam Jay Harrison (born 1973), American entrepreneur, inventor, and military acquisition reform advocate
- Adam Hart, English scientist, author, and broadcaster
- Adam Hart-Davis (born 1943), English scientist, author, photographer, historian, and broadcaster
- Adam Hartle (born 1979), American stand-up comedian
- Adam Hartlett (born 1986), Australian rules footballer
- Adam Harvey (born 1974), Australian country music singer
- Adam Harvey (born 1981), American artist and researcher
- Adam Paul Harvey (born 1984), English actor
- Adam Haseley (born 1996), American baseball player
- Adam Haslett (born 1970), American fiction writer and journalist
- Adam Haslmayr (1562–1630), German writer
- Adam Hasner (born 1969), American attorney and politician
- Adam Hastings (born 1996), Scottish rugby union player
- Adam Hattersley (born 1978), American politician and author
- Adam Hauser (born 1980), American ice hockey goaltender
- Adam Haverstock, American politician
- Adam Havlík (born 1991), Czech ice hockey player
- Adam Hawkes (1605–1672), English immigrant and American settler
- Adam Hawkins (born 1976), American recording and mix engineer
- Adam Hawley, American contemporary pop guitarist
- Adam Hay (after 1684–1775), Scottish officer in the British Army and politician
- Sir Adam Hay, 7th Baronet (1795–1867), Scottish baronet and politician
- Adam Hayden (born 1977), Australian rugby league footballer
- Adam Hayward (born 1984), American football player
- Adam Haywood (1875–1932), English footballer
- Adam Healey (born 1974), Italian internet entrepreneur and businessman
- Adam Heather (born 1972), English cricketer
- Adam Heidt (born 1977), American luger
- Adam Helcelet (born 1991), Czech athlete
- Adam Helewka (born 1995), Canadian ice hockey player
- Adam Helfant, American businessman
- Adam Hellborg (born 1998), Swedish footballer
- Adam Heller (born 1933), Israeli-American scientist and engineer
- Adam Helliker, English journalist and columnist
- Adam Helmer (c. 1754–1830), American Revolutionary War hero, also known as John Helmer or Hans Helmer
- Adam Helms (born 1974), American contemporary artist
- Adam Hemati (born 1995), Canadian soccer player
- Adam Hemmeon (1788–1867), Canadian politician
- Adam Hendershott (born 1983), American actor
- Adam Henderson (1873–after 1901), English footballer
- Adam Henderson, British musician and founding member of the English goth band Inkubus Sukkubus
- Adam Henein (1929–2020), Egyptian sculptor
- Adam Henley (born 1994), Welsh-American footballer
- Adam Henrich (born 1984), Canadian ice hockey player
- Adam Henrique (born 1990), Canadian ice hockey player
- Adam Henry (born 1972), American football player and coach
- Adam Henry (born 1974), American artist
- Adam Henry (born 1991), New Zealand rugby league footballer
- Adam Henson (born 1966), English farmer, author, and television presenter
- Adam Hepburn, 2nd Earl of Bothwell (c.1492–1513), Scottish nobleman
- Adam Hepburn of Craggis (died 1513), Scottish nobleman, killed in action at Flodden Field
- Adam Hepburn, Lord Humbie (c. 1600–1656), Scottish judge, politician, and soldier
- Adam Hepburn, Master of Hailes (after 1432–1479), Scottish nobleman
- Adam Herbert (born 1943), American academic administrator
- Adam Hertz, American politician
- Adam Herz (born 1972), American screenwriter and producer
- Adam Herzog (1829–1895), Swiss politician
- Adam Hess (basketball) (born 1981), American-German basketball player
- Adam Hess, British comedian and writer
- Adam Kaspar Hesselbach (1788–1856), German surgeon and anatomist
- Adam Heuskes (born 1976), Australian rules footballer
- Adam Heydel (1893–1941), Polish economist and politician
- Adam Hickey (born 1997), English cricketer
- Adam Hicks (born 1992), American actor, rapper, singer and songwriter
- Adam Higgins (born 1989) American contemporary painter
- Adam Higginbotham (born 1968), British journalist
- Adam Highfield (born 1981), New Zealand goalkeeper
- Adam Higson (born 1987), English rugby league footballer
- Adam Hildreth (born 1985), British entrepreneur
- Adam Hill (disambiguation), multiple people
- Adam Hills (1880–1941), English politician
- Adam Hills (born 1970), Australian comedian and TV presenter
- Adam G. Hinds, American politician
- Adam Hinshelwood (born 1984), English footballer and manager
- Adam Hiorth (1816–1871), Norwegian merchant and industrial pioneer
- Adam Hiorth (1879–1961), Norwegian barrister and playwright
- Adam Hlobus (born 1958), Belarus writer, novelist, essayist, poet, publisher, and artist
- Adam Hloušek (born 1988), Czech footballer
- Adam Hložek (born 2002), Czech footballer
- Adam Hmam (born 1994), Tunisian table tennis player
- Adam Hochberg, American radio correspondent
- Adam C. Hochfelder (born 1971), American real estate executive and businessman
- Adam Hochschild (born 1942), American author, journalist and lecturer
- Adam Hock (born 1964), American businessman
- Adam King Hodgins (1859–1932), Canadian businessman and politician
- Adam Hodgson (1788–1862), English merchant
- Adam Hofman (born 1980), Polish public relations professional and politician
- Adam Hofstedt (born 2002), Swedish alpine skier
- Adam Hogg (born 1934), Scottish footballer
- Adam Holender (born 1937), Polish cinematographer
- Adam Holland (born 1971), American rower
- Adam Holland (born 1987), English distance runner
- Adam Hollander (1964–1984), American film and television actor
- Adam Hollanek (1922–1998), Polish science fiction writer and journalist
- Adam Hollier, American politician
- Adam Hollingsworth, American politician
- Adam Hollioake (born 1971), Australian cricketer, mixed martial artist and boxer
- Adam Holloway, British politician
- Adam Holmes (born 1967), American politician and businessman
- Adam Holzman (born 1958), American jazz keyboardist
- Adam Holzman (born 1960), American classical guitarist
- Adam Hood, American singer-songwriter
- Adam Hootnick, American film and television producer and director
- Adam Hope (1813–1882), Canadian businessman and politician
- Adam Hope (1834–1916), Australian cricketer
- Adam Grant Horne (1829–1901), Canadian politician and businessman
- Adam Horovitz (born 1966), aka Ad-Rock, member of the Beastie Boys
- Adam Horovitz (born 1971), British poet
- Adam Horowitz (born 1971), American screenwriter and producer
- Adam Hose (born 1992), English cricketer
- Adam Hostetter (born 1974), American snowboarder
- Adam Houghton (died 1389), English Bishop
- Adam Houlihan (born 1978), Australian rules football player
- Adam Housley (born 1971), American journalist, baseball player, and winery owner
- Adam Coleman Howard, American actor, screenwriter, and film director
- Adam Howden (born 1983), English actor
- Adam Hrycaniuk (born 1984), Polish basketball player
- Adam Hsu (born 1941), Chinese martial artist and essayist, known as Xu Ji in China
- Adam Hubble (born 1986), Australian tennis player
- Adam Huber (born 1987), American actor and model
- Adam Huckle (born 1971), Zimbabwean cricketer
- Adam Hudspeth (1836–1890), Canadian lawyer and politician
- Adam Hugh, American table tennis player
- Adam Hughes (born 1967), American comic book artist and illustrator
- Adam Hughes (born 1977), English rugby league and rugby union footballer
- Adam Hughes (born 1982), Australian footballer
- Adam Hughes (born 1982), American poet
- Adam Hughes (born 1986), American volleyball coach
- Adam Hughes (born 1990), Welsh rugby union player
- Adam Humer (1908/1917–2001), Polish activist and politician
- Adam Humphreys (born 1982), Canadian filmmaker and entrepreneur
- Adam Humphries (born 1993), American football player
- Adam Hunt (born 1993), English darts player
- Adam Hunter (1908–1991), British politician
- Adam Hunter (1963–2011), Scottish golfer
- Adam Hunter (born 1981), Australian rules footballer
- Adam Mitchell Hunter (1871–1955), Scottish minister, mathematician, astronomer, and author
- Adam Huntsman (1786–1849), American lawyer and politician
- Adam Hurrey (born 1983), British journalist, author, and podcaster
- Adam Hurynowicz (1869–1894), Belarusian poet and folklorist
- Adam Húska (born 1997), Slovak ice hockey goaltender
- Adam Huss (born 1977), American television and film actor, producer, and writer
- Adam Hyeronimus, Australian jockey
- Adam Hyler (1735–1782), German privateer and whaleboat captain
- Adam Charlap Hyman (born 1989), American architect, designer, and artist
- Adam Hyzdu (born 1971), American baseball player

=== I ===
- Adam Iacobucci (born 1986), Australian rules footballer
- Adam Idah (born 2001), Irish footballer
- Adam Imer (born 1989), Brazilian field hockey player
- Adam Inglis (1929–1971), Australia rules footballer
- Adam Ingram (born 1947), Scottish politician
- Adam Ingram (born 1951), Scottish politician
- Adam Irigoyen (born 1997), American actor, singer, rapper and dancer
- Adam Ismailov (born 1976), Russian footballer
- Adam Itzel Jr. (1864–1893), American conductor and composer
- Adam Iwiński (1958–2010), Polish film director, cinematographer, and actor

=== J ===
- Adam Jabiri (born 1984), German footballer
- Adam Jackson (1929–1989), Irish greyhound trainer
- Adam Jackson (born 1994), English footballer
- Adam Jacobs (born c. 1984), American actor and singer
- Adam B. Jaffe (born 1955), American freelance economist
- Adam Jahn (born 1991), American soccer player
- Adam Jakobsen (born 1999), Danish footballer
- Adam Jakubech (born 1997), Slovak football goalkeeper
- Adam Jala (born 1979), Filipino politician
- Adam James (born 1972), English actor
- Adam James, Australian country singer and television host
- Adam Jameson (1860–1907), Scottish physician
- Adam Jamieson (born 1996), Canadian racing cyclist
- Adam Janisch (born 1975), English cricketer
- Adam Jankowski (born 1948), Austrian painter and professor
- Adam Jánoš (born 1992), Czech footballer
- Adam Jánošík (born 1992), Slovak ice hockey player
- Adam Janowski (born 1987), English rugby league footballer
- Adam Jansen, American state archivist for Hawaii
- Adam Jarchow (born 1978), American attorney and politician
- Adam Jarubas (born 1974), Polish politician
- Adam Jarzębski (c. 1590 – c. 1648), Polish composer, violinist, poet, and writer
- Adam Jastrzebski (born 1980), Polish painter, performer, art curator, and theoretician
- Adam Jasinski (born 1978), winner of season 9 of the American TV series Big Brother
- Adam Jeffery (born 1971), Australian lawn bowler
- Adam Jeffries, American actor
- Adam Jelonek (born 1968), Polish political scientist and professor
- Adam Jennings (born 1982), American football player
- Adam Jentleson, American writer and political commentator
- Adam Jezierski (born 1990), Polish actor
- Adam Johansson (born 1983), Swedish footballer
- Adam Byström Johansson (born 1996), Swedish ice hockey player
- Adam Johnson (1834–1922), American frontiersman and Confederate officer, known as Stovepipe Johnson
- Adam Johnson (born 1965), British judge
- Adam Johnson (born 1967), American novelist and short story writer
- Adam Johnson (born 1976), American electronic musician
- Adam Johnson (born 1978), English cricketer
- Adam Johnson (born 1979), American baseball pitcher
- Adam Johnson (born 1987), English footballer
- Adam Johnson (born 1994), American ice hockey player
- Adam Johnson, British classical pianist and conductor
- Adam Johnson, Welsh classical singer, half of Richard & Adam
- Adam R. Johnson, American politician
- Adam Joinson (born 1970), British author, academic, and public speaker
- Adam Jones (born 1963), British-Canadian scientist, writer, and photojournalist
- Adam Jones (born 1965), American musician and visual artist, guitarist for the rock band Tool
- Adam Jones (born 1980), English racing driver
- Adam Jones (born 1980), Welsh rugby union player
- Adam Jones (born 1981), Welsh rugby union player
- Adam Jones (born 1983), American football player, known on the field as Pacman Jones
- Adam Jones (born 1985), American baseball player
- Adam Jones (born 1989), Canadian lacrosse player
- Adam Jones (born 1993), Welsh rugby union referee
- Adam Garnet Jones, Canadian filmmaker and screenwriter
- Adam Joseph (born 1982), American singer-songwriter and music producer
- Adam Juratovac (born 1987), American football player and attorney
- Adam Juretzko (born 1971), German wrestler
- Adam Jury, Canadian game designer and graphic designer

=== K ===
- Adam Kącki (born 1998), Polish volleyball player
- Adam Kaczmarek (born 1961), Polish sports shooter
- Adam Tauman Kalai, American computer scientist
- Adam Kaloustian, American television producer
- Adam Kamani (born 1989), British businessman
- Adam Kaminski (born 1984), Canadian volleyball player
- Adam Kamis (born 1979), Singaporean para-athlete and motivational speaker, also known as Adam1AR
- Adam Kane (born 1968), American cinematographer, film director, television director, and producer
- Adam Kantor (born 1986), American actor and singer
- Adam Kappacher (born 1993), Austrian freestyle skier
- Adam Karabec (born 2003), Czech footballer
- Adam Kardasz (born 1983), Polish footballer
- Adam Karrillon (1853–1938), German writer and physician
- Adam Kasper, American record producer and engineer
- Adam Kassen (born 1974), American independent film director, actor, writer and producer
- Adam Katz, American lawyer and sports agent
- Adam Kaufman (born 1974), American actor
- Adam Kay (born 1980), British comedy writer, author, comedian, and doctor
- Adam Kay (born 1992), English footballer
- Adam Kaye (born 1968), British businessman and restaurateur
- Adam Kazanowski (born c. 1599–1649), Polish-Lithuanian noble
- Adam Keefe (born 1970), American basketball player
- Adam Keefe (born 1984), Canadian ice hockey player
- Adam Keel (1924–2018), Swiss artist
- Adam Keighran (born 1997), Australian rugby league footballer
- Adam Keller (born 1955), Israeli peace activist
- Adam Kellerman (born 1990), Australian wheelchair tennis player
- Ádám Kellner (born 1986), Hungarian tennis player
- Adam Stephen Kelly (born 1990), British director, screenwriter, producer, and journalist
- Adam Kelwick, British Muslim chaplain and humanitarian aid worker
- Adam Kemp (born 1990), American basketball player
- Adam Kempton (born 1957), Australian politician
- Adam Kendall, visual artist for the band Neurosis from 1990 to 1993
- Adam Kendon (born 1934), British linguist
- Adam Kennedy (1922–1997), American actor, screenwriter, novelist, and painter
- Adam Kennedy (born 1976), American baseball player
- Adam Kennedy (born 1983), Australian tennis player
- Adam Kennedy (born 1991), American football player
- Adam Kennedy (born 1992), Australian rules footballer
- Adam Kensy (born 1956), Polish footballer and manager
- Adam Kerinaiua (born 1974), Australian rules footballer
- Adam Kershen, Canadian DJ and music producer, half of the duo known as Adam K & Soha
- Adam Kersten (1930–1983), Polish historian
- Adam Kessel (1866–1946), American film company executive
- Adam Khaki, 14th-century Muslim saint
- Adam Khan (born 1985), British racing driver
- Adam Khoo (born 1974), Singaporean entrepreneur, author, and educator
- Adam Khudoyan (1921–2000), Armenian composer
- Adam Kidan (born 1964), American businessman
- Adam Kidron, British-born music producer and entrepreneur, managing partner of 4food
- Adam Kieft (born 1982), American football player
- Adam Kilgarriff (1960–2015), English corpus linguist, lexicographer, and author
- Adam Kimber (born 1969), Australian judge and politician
- Adam Kimbisa, Tanzanian politician
- Adam King (1783–1835), American politician
- Adam King (born 1995), Scottish footballer
- Adam King (born 1999), English cricketer
- Adam Kingsley (born 1975), Australian rules footballer
- Adam Kingwande (born 1989), Tanzanian footballer
- Adam Kinzinger (born 1978), U.S. Representative (R-IL)
- Adam Kirby (born 1988), British jockey
- Adam Kirkor (1818–1886), Polish publisher, journalist, and archeologist
- Adam Kirsch (born 1976), American poet and literary critic
- Adam Kisiel (1580/1600–1653), Ruthenian nobleman
- Adam Klasfeld, American journalist and playwright
- Adam Kleczkowski (1883–1949), Polish philologist and professor
- Adam Kleeberger (born 1984), Canadian rugby union player
- Adam Klein (born 1960), American opera singer
- Adam Klein (born 1962), American writer and musician
- Adam Klein (born 1988), American swimmer
- Adam Klein (born 1991), contestant on the 33rd season of Survivor
- Adam Kline (born 1944), American politician
- Adam W. Kline (1818–1898), American manufacturer, banker, and politician
- Adam Kloffenstein (born 2000), American professional baseball player
- Adam Kluger, American music manager and businessman
- Adam Klugman (born 1963), American media strategist and campaign consultant
- Adam Knight (born 1972), Australian art curator and dealer
- Adam Knioła (1911–1942), Polish footballer
- Adam Christopher Knuth (1687–1736), 1st Count of Knuthenborg
- Adam Koc (1891–1969), Polish politician, MP, soldier, journalist, and Freemason
- Adam Koch (born 1988), American basketball player
- Adam Adamandy Kochański (1631–1700), Polish mathematician, physicist, clock-maker, pedagogue, and librarian
- Adam Kocian (born 1995), German volleyball player
- Adam Koenig (born 1971), American politician
- Adam Koets (born 1984), American football player
- Adam Kogut (1895–1940), Polish footballer
- Adam Kok III (1811–1875), South African politician
- Adam Kokesh (born 1982), American libertarian talk show host and activist
- Adam Kokoszka (born 1986), Polish footballer
- Adam Kolarek (born 1989), American baseball pitcher
- Adam Kolasa (born 1975), Polish pole vaulter
- Adam Kolawa (1957–2011), American businessman
- Adam František Kollár (1718–1783), Slovak jurist and politician
- Adam Ignacy Komorowski (1699–1759), Polish archbishop
- Adam Kompała (born 1973), Polish footballer
- Adam Konar (born 1993), Canadian football player
- Adam Končić (born 1968), Croatian singer and actor
- Adam Kopas (born 1999), Slovak footballer
- Adam Kopczyński (1948–2021), Polish ice hockey player
- Adam Koppy (1973–2013), American mechanical engineer
- Adam Kopyciński (1907–1982), Polish conductor and composer
- Adam Korczyk (born 1995), Australian rugby union player
- Adam Korol (born 1974), Polish rower and politician
- Adam Korsak (born 1997), Australian American football player
- Adam Korson, Canadian actor
- Adam Kossowski (1905–1986), Polish artist
- Adam Kotsko (born 1980), American theologian, religious scholar, culture critic, and translator
- Adam Kotzmann (born 1993), Czech alpine skier
- Adam Kovacevich, American lobbyist and businessman
- Adam Kowalczyk (born 1975), American musician
- Adam Kowalski (1912–1971), Polish ice hockey player
- Adam Kowalski (born 1994), Polish volleyball player
- Adam Kownacki (born 1989), Polish boxer
- Adam Kozák (born 1999), Czech volleyball player
- Adam Kozłowiecki (1911–2007), Zambian Archbishop
- Adam Kraft (c. 1460–1509), German sculptor and master builder
- Adam Krajewski (1929–2000), Polish fencer
- Adam August Krantz (1809–1872), German mineralogist
- Adam Stanisław Krasiński (1714–1800), Polish noble
- Adam Kraus (born 1984), American football player
- Adam Krčík (born 1996), Slovak footballer
- Adam Kreek (born 1980), Canadian author, businessman, and rower
- Adam Krieger (1634–1666), German composer
- Adam Krijanovski, Russian politician
- Adam Krikorian (born 1974), American water polo coach
- Adam Królikiewicz (1894–1966), Polish horse rider and Army major
- Adam Krug (born 1983), American ice hockey player and coach
- Adam Krupa (born 1952), Polish footballer
- Adam Krupski (1706–1748), Polish professor, philosopher, and priest
- Adam Krzemiński (born 1945), Polish journalist ad commentator
- Adam Krzesiński (born 1965), Polish fencer
- Adam Krzysztofiak (1951–2008), Polish ski jumper
- Adam Krzyzak, Canadian computer engineer
- Adam Książek (born 1967), Polish footballer
- Adam Kszczot (born 1989), Polish middle-distance runner
- Adam Kuban (born 1974), American blogger, editor, and publisher
- Adam Kubert (born 1959), American comic book artist
- Adam Kuby (born 1961), American sculptor, visual artist, and landscape designer
- Adam Kuckhoff (1887–1943), German writer, journalist, and German resistance member
- Adam Kucz (born 1971), Polish footballer
- Adam Kuhlman, American animation director
- Adam Kuhn (1741–1817), American physician, naturalist, and professors
- Adam Kułach (born 1965), Polish diplomat
- Adam Kuligowski (born 1955), Polish chess master
- Adam Kunkel (born 1981), Canadian hurdler
- Adam Kunkel (born 1999), American basketball player
- Adam Kuper (born 1941), South African anthropologist
- Adam Kurak (born 1985), Russian wrestler
- Adam Kury (born 1969), American bassist and vocalist
- Adam Kwasman (born 1982), American attorney and politician
- Adam Kwasnik (born 1983), Australian footballer

=== L ===
- Adam Lach (born 1983), Polish photographer
- Adam LaClave, American musician and singer
- Adam Lacko (born 1984), Czech racing driver
- Adam Laczkó (born 1997), Slovak footballer
- Adam Lakomy (born 2006), American artistic gymnast
- Adam Lallana (born 1988), English footballer
- Adam Lam (born 1987), Israeli footballer
- Adam Lamberg (born 1984), American actor
- Adam Lambert (born 1982), American singer
- Adam Lambert (born 1997), Australian snowboarder
- Adam Lamhamedi (born 1995), Moroccan-Canadian alpine skier
- Adam Leroy Lane (born 1964), American convicted murderer, dubbed as the Highway Killer
- Adam Lange (born 1979), Australian rules footballer
- Adam Langer (born 1967), American author
- Adam Lanza (1992–2012), American spree killer, perpetrator of the 2012 Sandy Hook Elementary School shooting
- Adam I. Lapidus (born 1963), American television writer
- Adam LaRoche (born 1979), American baseball player
- Adam Larsson (born 1992), Swedish ice hockey player
- Adam LaVorgna (born 1981), American actor
- Adam Laxman (1766–1806?), Finnish military officer, emissary to Japan
- Adam Lazzara (born 1981), lead singer of Taking Back Sunday
- Adam Leavy (born 1995), Irish rugby union player
- Adam Leber (born 1977), American talent manager, entrepreneur, and investor
- Adam LeBor, British author, journalist, writing coach, and editor
- Adam Lebovitz, American film and television producer
- Adam Ledgeway (born 1970), British academic linguist
- Adam Ledwoń (1974–2008), Polish footballer
- Adam S. Lee (born 1968), American politician
- Adam LeFevre (born 1950), American character actor, poet and playwright
- Adam Le Fondre (born 1986), English footballer
- Adam Legzdins (born 1986), English football goalkeeper
- Adam Lehan, British musician
- Adam Leibovich (born 1970), American theoretical physicist
- Adam P. Leighton (1851–1922), American politician
- Adam Leipzig (born 1958), American film and theatre producer, author, and businessman
- Adam Franz Lennig (1803–1866), German Catholic theologian
- Adam Leon, American film director and writer
- Adam Leonard (born 1986), American gridiron football player
- Adam Leonard, English singer-songwriter
- Adam Lepa (1939–2022), Polish Roman Catholic prelate
- Adam Lerner, American businessman and museum curator
- Adam B. Lerner, American political scientist
- Adam Lerrick, American economist and politician
- Adam Lesage (fl. 1683), French occultist and alleged sorcerer
- Adam Leszczyński (born 1975), Polish historian, journalist, and professor
- Adam Leventhal (born 1979), English television presenter and journalist
- Adam Leventhal (born 1979), American software engineer
- Adam Levin (born 1976/1977), American fiction author
- Adam K. Levin, American politician, author, and podcast host
- Adam Levine (born 1969), American politician
- Adam Levine (born 1979), American lead singer and guitarist of Maroon 5
- Adam Levy (born 1966), jazz guitarist and freelance journalist
- Adam Levy (born 1970), British actor
- Adam Ludwig Lewenhaupt (1659–1719), Swedish general
- Adam Lewis (born 1999), English footballer
- Adam Lewis, British composer, songwriter, and producer, also known as Mr Ronz
- Adam Liaw (born 1978), Malaysian-Australian chef, television presenter, and author
- Adam Liberatore (born 1987), American baseball pitcher
- Adam Lightstone, Canadian politician
- Adam Lile (1885–1954), New Zealand rugby footballer
- Adam Lilling (born 1970), American entrepreneur
- Adam Lind (born 1983), American baseball player
- Adam Lindemann, American investor, writer, art collector, and art dealer
- Adam Lindsay, American businessman
- Adam Ling (born 1991), New Zealand rower
- Adam Lingner (born 1960), American football player
- Adam Lipiński, Polish economist, editor, and lecturer
- Adam Lippes (born 1972), American fashion designer, founded ADAM fashion label
- Adam Liptak (born 1960), American legal journalist
- Adam Lisagor (born 1978), American commercial director and businessman
- Adam Lisewski (1944–2023), Polish fencer
- Adam Liška (born 1999), Slovak ice hockey player
- Adam C. Listman (1859–1943), American clothing cutter and politician
- Adam Liszt (1776–1827), Danube-Swabian musician
- Adam Litovitz (1982–2019), Canadian musician and composer
- Adam Little (1919–2008), Scottish footballer
- Adam Brown Littlepage (1859–1921), American lawyer and politician
- Adam Littleton (1627–1694), English cleric and lexicographer
- Adam Lively (born 1961), British novelist
- Adam Livingston (c. 1723–1795), Scottish soldier and politician
- Adam Livingstone (born 1998), Scottish footballer
- Adam Lizakowski (born 1956), Polish poet, translator, and photographer
- Adam Locke (born 1970), English footballer
- Adam Lockwood (born 1981), English footballer
- Adam Loewen (born 1984), Canadian baseball player
- Adam Loftus (1533–1605), Irish archbishop
- Adam Loftus, Irish politician and public official
- Adam Loftus, 1st Viscount Loftus (c. 1568–1643), Irish peer
- Adam Loftus, 1st Viscount Lisburne (1647–1691), Anglo-Irish peer and military commander
- Adam Logan (born 1975), Canadian mathematician and Scrabble player
- Adam London (born 1988), English cricketer
- Adam Long (born 1987), American golfer
- Adam Long (born 1991), British actor
- Adam Long (born 2000), Manx footballer
- Adam Long, American actor, screenwriter, and director
- Adam Lonicer (1528–1586), German botanist, also known as Adam Lonitzer or Adamus Lonicerus
- Adam Loomis (born 1992), American-Nordic combined skier
- Adam Lopez (born 1975), Australian pop musician, vocal coach, and session vocalist
- Adam Lorenc (born 1998), Polish volleyball player
- Adam Bhala Lough (born 1979), American film director, screenwriter, and documentary filmmaker
- Adam Lovatt (born 1999), English footballer
- Adam Lovell (born 1977), founder and owner of WriteAPrisoner.com
- Adam Lovelock (born 1982), Australian boxer
- Adam Lowe (born 1985), British writer, performer, and publisher
- Adam Lowitt, American stand-up comedian, co-executive producer, and supervising producer
- Adam Lowry (born 1993), Canadian ice hockey player
- Adam Lucas (born 1983), Australian swimmer
- Adam Edward Ludy (1831–1910), American Civil War veteran
- Adam Lundgren (born 1986), Swedish actor
- Adam Lundqvist (born 1994), Swedish footballer
- Adam Lupel (born 1970), American writer
- Adam Lux (1765–1793), German revolutionary and sympathiser
- Adam Lyons (born 1981), American entrepreneur and businessman
- Adam Lyth (born 1987), English cricketer

=== M ===
- Adam MacDougall (born 1975), Australian rugby league footballer
- Adam MacKenzie (born 1984), Scottish field hockey defender
- Adam Macrow (born 1978), Australian racing driver
- Adam Maher (born 1993), Dutch footballer
- Adam Maida (born 1930), Cardinal Archbishop Emeritus of Detroit
- Adam Mair (born 1979), Canadian professional hockey player
- Adam Makowicz (born 1940), Polish-Canadian pianist and composer, born Adam Matyszkowicz
- Adam Malik (1917–1984), Indonesia's third vice president
- Adam Gale Malloy (1830–1911), Irish-American politician and U.S. Army officer
- Adam Małysz (born 1977), Polish ski jumper and rally racing driver
- Adam Gerard Mappa (1754–1828), Dutch type-founder, Patriot, and active colonel
- Adam Maraana (born 2003), Arab-Israeli swimmer
- Adam Marsh (c. 1200–18 November 1259), English Franciscan, scholar and theologian, also known as Adam de Marisco
- Adam Marty (1837–1923), US Civil War soldier
- Adam Matthews (born 1992), Welsh footballer
- Adam J. Matzger, American chemist
- Adam McCune (born 1985), American novelist
- Adam McDonough (born 1985), American mixed martial artist
- Adam Gerrond McDougall (1836–1907), Canadian reeve
- Adam McGurk (born 1989), Northern Irish footballer
- Adam McKay (born 1968), American screenwriter, director and comedian
- Adam McPhee (born 1982), Australian rules football player
- Adam Meadows (born 1974), American football player
- Adam Messinger, Canadian songwriter, producer, and multi-instrumentalist, nicknamed "Messy", member of The Messengers production team
- Adam Frans van der Meulen (1632–1690), Flemish Baroque painter
- Adam Michnik (born 1946), Polish historian and former dissident
- Adam Mickiewicz (1798–1855), Polish poet
- Adam El Mihdawy (born 1989), American tennis player
- Adam Miller (born 1979), American painter
- Adam David Miller (1922–2020), American poet, writer, publisher, and radio programmer and producer
- Adam Lee Miller, American musician
- Adam S. Miller, American author
- Adam Moffat (born 1986), Scottish footballer
- Adam Mohammed (born 2006), American football player
- Adam Mójta (born 1986), Polish footballer
- Adam Mokoka (born 1998), French basketball player
- Adam Moleyns (died 1450), Bishop of Chichester, Lord Privy Seal
- Adam Gottlob Moltke (1710–1792), Danish courtier, statesman, and diplomat
- Adam Wilhelm Moltke (1785–1864), Danish nobleman, landowner, civil servant, and politician
- Adam Morrison (born 1984), American basketball player and coach
- Adam Egypt Mortimer, American director, comic writer, and producer
- Adam Morton (1945–2020), Canadian philosopher
- Adam Kelly Morton (born 1973), Canadian actor, writer, producer, and teacher, also known as Adam Kelly
- Adam Pulchrae Mulieris, French writer
- Adam Müller (1779–1829), German publicist, literary critic, political economist and theorist, Ritter von Nitterdorf
- Adam Müller-Guttenbrunn (1852–1923), Austrian author
- Adam August Müller (1811–1844), Danish history painter
- Adam Ali Musab (born 1995), Qatari middle-distance runner
- Adam Muto, American artist and director

=== N ===
- Ádám Nádasdy (1947–2026), Hungarian linguist and poet
- Adam Nagaitis (born 1985), British actor
- Adam Neely (born 1988), American bassist and YouTuber
- Adam Niedzielski (born 1973), Polish economist and government administrator
- Adam Ndlovu (1970–2012), Zimbabwean footballer
- Adam Neat (1976/1977–2019), Australian DJ, known professionally as Adam Sky
- Adam Albert von Neipperg (1775–1829), Austrian general and statesman
- Adam Nelson (born 1975), American shot putter
- Adam Nemec (born 1985), Slovak footballer
- Adam Zachary Newton, American academic
- Adam Nichols (musician) (born 1991), British musician
- Adam Nicolson (born 1957), British author
- Adam Nimoy (born 1956), American TV director, son of actor Leonard Nimoy
- Adam Nussbaum (born 1955), American jazz musician

=== O ===
- Adam Oates (born 1962), Canadian hockey player
- Adam Oehlenschläger (1779–1850), Danish poet
- Adam Friedrich Oeser (1717–1799), German etcher, painter, and sculptor
- Adam Ołdakowski (born 1955), Polish politician
- Adam Olearius (1599–1671), German scholar, mathematician, geographer and librarian, born Adam Ölschläger or Oehlschlaeger
- Adam Oller (born 1994), American baseball player
- Adam Ondra (born 1993), Czech rock climber
- Adam Orleton (died 1345), Bishop of Winchester
- Adam Osborne (1939–2003), author, publisher, and computer designer, founder of the Osborne Computer Corporation
- Adam Duff O'Toole (died 1328), Irish convict
- Adam Ottavino (born 1985), American baseball player
- Adam Otterburn of Auldhame and Reidhall (died 1548), Scottish lawyer and diplomat
- Adam Petrovich Ozharovsky (1776–1855), Russian general

=== P ===
- Adam Page (born 1991), American wrestler whose real name is Stephen Woltz
- Adam Page (born 1992), American ice sled hockey player
- Adam Page (born 1997), English footballer
- Adam Paine (1843–1877), U.S. Army Indian scout
- Adam Pajer (born 1995), Czech footballer
- Adam Paljov (born 1970), Serbian politician
- Adam Pallin, American record producer, songwriter, and multi-instrumentalist, also known as 1–900
- Adam Pally (born 1982), American actor and comedian
- Adam Palma (born 1974), Polish-British guitarist and teacher
- Adam Pålsson, Swedish actor and musician
- Adam Pankey (born 1994), American football player
- Adam Papalia, Australian sports commentator
- Adam Papée (1895–1990), Polish fencer
- Adam Parada (born 1981), American-Mexican basketball player
- Adam Pardy (born 1984), Canadian ice hockey player
- Adam Parfitt (born 1974), Canadian rower
- Adam Parfrey (1957–2018), American journalist, editor, and publisher of Feral House
- Adam Parker (born 1972), American prelate of the Roman Catholic Church
- Adam Parker (born 1973), New Zealand rugby union player
- Adam Parkhomenko (born 1985), American political strategist and organizer
- Adam Parkhouse (born 1992), Australian footballer
- Adam Parore (born 1971), New Zealand cricket player
- Adam Parr (born 1965), British businessman
- Adam Parsons (born 1970), English television and radio presenter
- Adam Parvipontanus (c. 1100–02 – c. 1157–1169), Anglo-Norman scholastic and churchman, also known as Adam of Balsham
- Adam Pascal (born 1970), American actor and singer
- Adam Pastor (d. 1560s), German Catholic priest
- Adam Patel, Baron Patel of Blackburn (1940–2019), British businessman and politician
- Adam Pattison (born 1986), Australian rules footballer
- Adam Pavlesic (born 2002), Australian football goalkeeper
- Adam Pavlásek (born 1994), Czech tennis player
- Adam Pawlikowski (1925–1976), Polish actor
- Adam Payerl (born 1991), Canadian ice hockey player
- Adam Payne (1781–1832), American itinerant minister
- Adam Payne (born 1970), American track cyclist and road bicycle racer
- Adam Pazio (born 1992), Polish footballer
- Adam Pearce (born 1978), American wrestler
- Adam Pearce (born 1997), Australian footballer
- Adam Pearlman (born 2005), South African footballer
- Adam Pearson (born 1964), English rugby league club team owner
- Adam Pearson (born 1985), British actor, presenter, and campaigner
- Adam Pearson, English guitarist for the band The Sisters of Mercy
- Adam Peaty (born 1994), English swimmer
- Adam Pecháček (born 1995), Czech basketball player
- Adam Pecorari (born 1984), American racing driver
- Adam Peek (born 1977), Australian rugby league footballer
- Adam Pelech (born 1994), Canadian ice hockey player
- Adam Peltzman, American television writer and producer
- Adam Pendleton (born 1984), American conceptual artist
- Adam Penenberg (born 1962), American journalist and educator
- Adam Pengilly (born 1977), British skeleton racer
- Adam Perelle (1640–1695), French artist and writer
- Adam Perry (born 1979), Australian rugby league footballer
- Adam Peška (born 1997), Czech paralympic athlete
- Adam Peters (born 1979), American football executive
- Adam Peters (rugby league) (born 1974), Australian rugby league footballer
- Adam Peterson (born 1965), American baseball pitcher
- Adam Peterson (born 1974), American tennis player
- Adam Peterson (born 1979), American baseball pitcher
- Adam Petersson (born 2000), Swedish footballer
- Adam Petri (1454–1527), German printer, publisher, and bookseller
- Adam Petrouš (born 1977), Czech footballer
- Adam Pettersson (born 1992), Swedish ice hockey player
- Ádám Pettik (born 1972), Hungarian musician, singer-songwriter, percussionist, and instrument creator
- Adam Pettle (born 1973), Canadian playwright, radio producer, and television writer
- Adam Petty (1980–2000), American race car driver
- Adam Pettyjohn (born 1977), American baseball pitcher
- Adam Phelan (born 1991), Australian racing cyclist
- Adam Philip (1856–1945), Scottish minister and author
- Adam Philippe, Comte de Custine (1740–1793), French general
- Adam Phillips (born 1954), British psychoanalytic psychotherapist and essayist
- Adam Phillips (born 1971), Australian filmmaker, animator, and freelancer
- Adam Phillips (born 1998), English footballer
- Adam Phillips, British musician
- Adam Piatt (born 1976), American baseball player
- Adam Piccolotti (born 1988), American mixed martial artist
- Adam Pickering (born 1981), Australian rules footballer and coach
- Adam Pierończyk (born 1970), Polish jazz saxophonist and composer
- Adam Pietrasik, Polish canoeist
- Adam Pietraszko (born 1982), Polish speedway racer
- Adam Piłsudski (1869–1935), Polish senator
- Adam Pilch (1965–2010), Polish Lutheran clergy and military chaplain
- Adam Pine (born 1976), Australian swimmer
- Adam Pineault (born 1986), American ice hockey player
- Adam Pinkhurst, English scribe
- Adam Pisoni, American entrepreneur and businessman
- Adam Plachetka (born 1985), Czech singer
- Adam Plack, Australian didgeridoo player, composer, and producer
- Adam Alfred Plater (1836–1909), Polish-Lithuanian noble and archaeologist
- Adam Platt (born 1958), American writer and restaurant critic
- Adam Plunkett (1903–1992), Scottish footballer
- Adam Plutko (born 1991), American baseball pitcher
- Adam Podgórecki (1925–1998), Polish sociologist
- Adam Podlesh (born 1983), American football player
- Adam Pœrtner (1817–1910), German-American mason, miller, and politician
- Adam Polášek (born 1991), Czech ice hockey player
- Adam Polkinghorne (born 1975), Australian cricket player
- Adam Pollina, American comic book artist and penciller
- Adam F. Poltl (1891–1969), American businessman and politician
- Adam Pompey (born 1998), New Zealand rugby league footballer
- Adam Poniński (1732/1733–1798), Polish nobleman and Prince
- Adam Poniński (1758–1816), Polish nobleman, Prince, politician, soldier, and officer
- Adam Porter (born 2002), English footballer
- Adam Posen (born 1966), American economist
- Adam Possamai (born 1970), Belgian sociologist and novelist
- Adam Józef Potocki (1822–1872), Polish politician
- Adam Powell (1496–1546), English politician
- Adam Powell (1912–1982), English cricketer
- Adam Powell (born 1976), Welsh computer programmer, game designer, and businessman
- Adam Powell (born 1981), British director and photographer
- Adam Powell (born 1987), English rugby union footballer
- Adam Clayton Powell (1865–1953), American pastor, activist, and author
- Adam Clayton Powell Jr. (1908–1972), American politician
- Adam Clayton Powell III (born 1946), American journalist, media executive, and scholar
- Adam Clayton Powell IV (born 1962), American politician
- Adam Pragier (1886–1976), Polish economist, professor, socialist activist, politician, and writer
- Adam Prażmowski (1821–1885), Polish astronomer and astrophysicist
- Adam Prentice (born 1997), American football player
- Adam Pretty, Australian sports photographer
- Adam Pribićević (1880–1957), Croatian Serb publisher, writer, and politician
- Adam Price (born 1967), Danish screenwriter, playwright, and restaurateur
- Adam Price (born 1968), Welsh politician
- Adam Priestley (born 1990), Gibraltarian footballer
- Adam Pritzker (born 1984), American entrepreneur
- Adam Próchnik (1892–1942), Polish socialist activist, politician, and historian
- Adam Proudlock (born 1981), English footballer
- Adam Przeworski (born 1940), Polish-American political scientist and professor
- Adam Przybek (born 2000), Welsh football goalkeeper
- Adam Ptáček (born 1980), Czech pole vaulter
- Adam Ptáčník (born 1985), Czech track cyclist
- Adam Pudil (born 2005), Czech footballer
- Adam Pugh (born 1977), American politician
- Adam Puławski, Polish historian and researcher
- Adam Purdy (born 1981), Canadian Paralympic swimmer
- Adam Purpis (born 1883, death date unknown), Latvian Soviet spy
- Adam Purple (1930–2015), American activist and gardener
- Adam Putnam (born 1974), American politician
- Adam Puza (born 1951), Polish politician
- Adam Pynacker (1622–1673), Dutch painter

=== Q ===
- Adam Quesnell (born 1981/1982), American stand-up comedian
- Adam Quick (born 1981), Australian basketball player
- Adam Quinlan (born 1992), Australian rugby league footballer
- Adam Quinn (born 1973), American bagpipe player, instructor, and composer

=== R ===
- Adam Rachel (born 1976), English footballer
- Adam Radecki (born 1994), Polish footballer
- Adam Radmall (born 1984), English ice hockey player
- Adam S. Radomsky, Canadian psychologist
- Adam Radwan (born 1997), English rugby union player
- Adam Rafferty (born 1969), American guitarist and composer
- Adam Raga (born 1982), Spanish motorcycle trials racer
- Adam Ragusea (born 1982), American YouTuber and journalist
- Adam Rahayaan, Indonesian politician
- Adam Raine (born 1999), British-American football player
- Adam Rainer (1899–1950), dwarf and giant
- Adam Rolland Rainy (1862–1911), Scottish politician
- Adam Ralegh (c. 1480–1545), English politician
- Adam Ramage (1772–1850), printing press manufacturer
- Adam Ramanauskas (born 1980), Australian rules footballer
- Adam Randell (born 2000), English footballer
- Adam Rapacki (1909–1970), Polish politician and diplomat
- Adam Raphael (born 1938), English journalist
- Adam Rapoport (born 1969), American magazine editor
- Adam Rapp (born 1968), American novelist, musician and director
- Adam Raška (born 1994), Czech ice hockey player
- Adam Raška (born 2001), Czech ice hockey player
- Adam Ratajczyk (born 2002), Polish footballer
- Adam Ravenstahl (born 1984), American politician
- Adam Ray, American comedian, actor, and YouTuber
- Adam E. Ray (1808–1865), American politician and farmer
- Adam Rayner (born 1977), English actor
- Adam Rayski (1913–2008), Franco-Polish intellectual
- Adam Reach (born 1993), English footballer
- Adam Redmond (born 1993), American football player
- Adam Redzik (born 1977), Polish lawyer, historian, and professor
- Adam Reed (born 1970), American voice actor, writer, director and producer
- Adam Reed (born 1975), English footballer
- Adam Reed (born 1991), English footballer, also known as Adam Tull
- Adam Reefdy (born 2004), Singaporean footballer
- Adam Reid, Canadian actor, writer, producer, and director
- Adam Reid, American writer and film director
- Adam Reideborn (born 1992), Swedish ice hockey goaltender
- Adam Remmele (1877–1951), German politician
- Adam Render (1822–1881), German-American hunter, prospector, and trader
- Adam Rennocks (born 1982), English cricketer
- Adam Replogle (born 1990), American football player
- Adam Resnick, American director, producer, and writer
- Adam Reusner (c. 1496–1575), German mystic, hymn-writer, and poet
- Adam Rex (born 1973), American illustrator and author of children's books
- Adam Reynolds (born 1990), Australian Rugby League player
- Adam Rich (1968–2023), American actor
- Adam Richard (born 1971), Australian comedian, actor, radio presenter, writer, and media personality
- Adam Richards (born 1980), American boxer
- Adam Richards, New Zealand drifting driver
- Adam Richardson (Australian footballer) (born 1974), Australian rules footballer
- Adam Riches (born 1973), English comedian
- Adam Richetti (1909–1938), American criminal and bank robber
- Adam Richman (born 1974), American actor and television personality
- Adam Richman (born 1982), American indie pop singer-songwriter
- Adam Rickitt (born 1978), English actor
- Adam Ridley (born 1942), British economist, civil servant, and banker
- Adam Riedy (born 1981), American short-track speed skater
- Adam Riegler (born 1998), American actor
- Adam Ries (1492–1559), German mathematician
- Adam Riess (born 1969), American astrophysicist
- Adam Rifkin (born 1966), American film director, producer, writer and actor, sometimes credited as Rif Coogan
- Adam Riggs (born 1972), American baseball player
- Adam Riley (born 1992), English cricketer
- Adam Rippon (born 1989), American figure skater
- Adam Rita (born 1947), American gridiron football coach and general manager
- Adam Ritson (born 1976), Australian rugby league footballer
- Adam Rittenberg (born 1981), American blogger and sports journalist
- Adam Rizwee (born 1991), Maldivian actor
- Adam Ro (born 1990), Ghanaian artist and social activist
- Adam Roarke (1937–1996), American actor and film director
- Adam Robak (born 1957), Polish fencer
- Adam Roberge (born 1997), Canadian cyclist
- Adam Roberts (born 1940), emeritus professor of international relations at Oxford University
- Adam Roberts (born 1965), British academic, critic, and novelist
- Adam Roberts (born 1979), American food writer and humorist also known as Amateur Gourmet
- Adam Roberts (born 1984), Canadian motorcycle racer
- Adam Robertson (ca. 1812–1882), Canadian politician
- Adam Robertson, American politician, businessman, and engineer
- Adam Robertson, Australian dummer for the band Magic Dirt
- Adam Robinson (born 1987), English rugby league player
- Adam Robinson, American educator, freelance author, and chess player
- Adam M. Robinson Jr. (born 1950), American U.S. Navy vice admiral
- Adam Robitel (born 1978), American film director, producer, screenwriter, and actor
- Adam Robson (1928–2007), Scottish rugby union player
- Adam Henry Robson (1892–1980), British educationist and Senior Officer in the Royal Air Force
- Adam Rocap (1854–1892), American baseball player
- Adam Rodriguez (born 1975), American actor, screenwriter and director
- Adam Roffman, American film producer
- Adam Rogacki (born 1976), Polish politician
- Adam Keir Rodger (1855–1946), Scottish businessman and politician
- Adam Rogers (born 1965), American jazz guitarist
- Adam Rogers (born 1985), Canadian football player
- Adam Rolland (1734–1819), Scottish judge and philanthropist
- Adam Rome (born 1970), American environmental historian
- Adam Ronikier (1881–1952), Polish politician
- Adam Rooks (born 2000), English rugby league footballer
- Adam Rooney (born 1988), Irish footballer
- Adam Rosales (born 1983), American baseball player
- Adam Roscrow (born 1995), Welsh footballer
- Adam Rose (wrestler) (born 1979), South African wrestler
- Adam Rosen (born 1984), American-born British luger Olympian
- Adam Rosendale, American politician and businessman
- Adam Rosenke (born 1984), Canadian bobsledder
- Adam Ross (born 1967), American author
- Adam Ross, American guitarist, songwriter, and producer
- Adam Rossington (born 1993), English cricketer
- Adam Franciszek Ksawery Rostkowski (1660–1738), Polish Roman Catholic prelate, writer, and translator
- Adam Daniel Rotfeld (born 1938), Polish foreign minister
- Adam Rothenberg (born 1975), American actor
- Adam Rouse (born 1992), Zimbabwean-English cricketer
- Adam Rowe (born 1992), English stand-up comedian and podcaster
- Adam Rowntree (born 1989), English footballer
- Adam Roxburgh (born 1970), Scottish rugby union player and coach
- Adam Roynon (born 1988), British motorcycle speedway rider
- Adam Ruben, American writer, comedian, rapper, storyteller, science communicator, and molecular biologist
- Adam Rubin, American children's author
- Adam Ruckwood (born 1974), British swimmer
- Adam Rudawski (born 1966), Polish politician, economist, and academic professor
- Adam Rudden (born 1983), Irish poet
- Adam Rudolph (born 1955), American jazz composer and percussionist
- Adam Rufer (born 1991), Czech ice hockey player
- Adam Rulík (born 1996), Czech ice hockey player
- Adam Rundle (born 1984), English footballer
- Adam Rundqvist (born 1990), Swedish ice hockey player
- Adam Runnalls (born 1998), Canadian biathlete
- Adam Rusling (born 2003), English rugby league footballer
- Adam Russel (fl. 1295), English politician
- Adam Russell (baseball) (born 1983), American baseball pitcher
- Adam Russo (born 1983), Canadian-Italian ice hockey goaltender
- Adam Rutherford (born 1975), British geneticist, author, and broadcaster
- Adam Rutter (born 1986), Australian racewalker
- Adam Ruud (born 1983), American soccer player
- Adam Ružička (born 1999), Slovak ice hockey player
- Adam Ryczkowski (born 1997), Polish footballer
- Adam Rzhevusky (1801–1888), Polish-Russian general

=== S ===
- Adam Saad (born 1994), Australian rules footballer
- Adam Saad (born 2004), Ghanaian footballer
- Adam Saathoff (born 1975), American sport shooter
- Adam Sabra, American historian and professor
- Adam Sadler (born 1980), English football goalkeeper and coach
- Adam Sadowsky (1970–2021), American entrepreneur and actor
- Adam Sahakyan (1996–2016), Armenian Armed Forces sergeant
- Adam Saif (born 1957), Yemeni actor
- Adam Saitiev (born 1977), Russian wrestler
- Adam Hassan Sakak (born 1965), Sudanese sprinter
- Adam Saks (born 1974), Danish painter
- Adam Saldana (born 2002), American soccer player
- Adam Saleh (born 1993), American YouTuber and boxer
- Adam Saliba (born 1972), Australian rules footballer
- Adam Salky (born 1978), American television and film director
- Adam Salmon, American researcher and professor
- Adam Saltsman, American video game designer, also known as Adam Atomic
- Adam Sampson (born 1960), English politician
- Adam Sanders (born 1988), American singer and songwriter
- Adam Sandler (born 1966), American film actor
- Adam Sandow, American businessman
- Adam Sandurski (born 1953), Polish wrestler
- Adam Sanford (born 1975), Dominica cricketer
- Adam Aleksander Sanguszko (1590–1653), noble of the Polish-Lithuanian Commonwealth
- Adam Stanisław Sapieha (1828–1903), Polish nobleman, landlord, and politician
- Adam Steele (born 1980), American sprinter
- Adam Stefan Sapieha (1867–1951), Polish cardinal, prince and senator, Archbishop of Kraków
- Adam Sarafian (born 1986), American geologist and pole vaulter
- Adam Sarota (born 1988), Australian footballer
- Adam Satchell (born 1981), American politician and educator
- Adam Satke (born 1994), Czech canoeist
- Adam Savage (born 1967), American special effects designer, fabricator, actor, educator, and television personality, co-host of MythBusters
- Adam Savić (born 1986), Bosnian handball goalkeeper
- Adam Sawyer (born 1999), Australian footballer
- Adam Scaife (born 1970), British physicist
- Adam Scanlon (born 1996), American politician
- Adam Schaff (1913–2006), Polish Marxist philosopher
- Adam Schantz (1819–1879), German-American immigrant, farmer, and politician
- Adam Scharrer (1889–1948), German writer
- Adam Schefter (born 1966), American sportswriter and TV analyst
- Adam Scheier (born 1973), American football player and coach
- Adam Schein, American radio and TV sportscaster
- Adam Scheinman, American screenwriter and tennis player
- Adam Schenk (born 1992), American golfer
- Adam A. Schider (1886–19??), American politician
- Adam Schiff (born 1960), American politician
- Adam Schindler (born 1983), American mixed martial artist
- Adam Schlesinger (1967–2020), American bassist, songwriter, composer, record producer and founding member of the band Fountains of Wayne
- Adam Schlicht, American port director
- Adam Schmitt (born 1968), American singer-songwriter
- Adam Schneider (born 1984), Australian rules footballer
- Adam Schnelting, Missouri politician
- Adam Schoenberg (born 1980), American composer
- Adam Schoenfeld, American poker player and columnist
- Adam Scholefield (born 1985), British water polo player and researcher
- Adam Schreiber (born 1962), American football player
- Adam Schriemer (born 1995), Canadian volleyball player
- Adam Schroadter, American politician
- Adam Schroeder, American film producer
- Adam Lewis Schroeder, Canadian novelist and short story writer
- Adam Schröter (c. 1525–1572), Silesian humanist, poet, and alchemist
- Adam Schubert (born 1985), Australian rugby league footballer
- Adam Schultz (born 1983/1984), American photographer
- Adam Schusser (born 1991), Czech-German ice hockey player
- Adam Schwadron, American politician and businessman
- Adam Scicluna, Australian entertainer
- Adam Scime (born 1982), Canadian composer and double bassist
- Adam Scorgie, Canadian documentary film producer
- Adam Scott (1871–unknown), Scottish footballer
- Adam Scott (born 1973), American actor
- Adam Scott (born 1980), Australian golfer
- Adam Scut (fl. 1382–1401), English politician
- Adam Searle, Australian politician
- Adam Searles (born 1981), British actor
- Adam Sedbar (c. 1502–1537), Abbot of Jervaulx
- Adam Sedgwick (1785–1873), English geologist
- Adam Sedgwick (1854–1913), British zoologist and professor
- Adam Sedlák (born 1991), Czech ice hockey player
- Adam See (born 1988), Malaysian footballer
- Adam Seelig (born 1975), Canadian-American poet, playwright, director, composer, and Artistic Director
- Adam Segal, American cybersecurity expert
- Adam Selwood (born 1984), Australian rules football player
- Adam Selzer (born 1980), American author
- Adam Seminaris (born 1998), American baseball player
- Adam Sender, American hedge fund manager and art collector
- Adam Senior (born 2002), English footballer
- Adam Senn (born 1984), American model
- Adam Seroczyński (born 1974), Polish sprint canoeist
- Adam Serwer (born 1982), American journalist and author
- Adam Sessler (born 1973), American video game journalist, television personality, consultant, and co-host on X-Play
- Adam Setla (born 1992), Polish footballer
- Adam Setliff (born 1969), American discus thrower
- Adam Alis Setyano (born 1993), Indonesian footballer
- Adam G. Sevani (born 1992), American actor and dancer
- Adam Seward (born 1982), American football player
- Adam Seybert (1773–1825), American politician
- Adam Seymour (born 1967), English cricketer
- Adam Seymour, English guitarist and songwriter
- Adam Shabala (born 1978), American baseball player
- Adam Shaban (born 1983), Kenyan footballer
- Adam Shaheen (born 1964), British-Canadian artist, television producer, and screenwriter
- Adam Shaheen (born 1994), American football player
- Baba Adam Shahid, Muslim preacher
- Adam Shaiek (born 1989), French footballer
- Adam Shakoor (1947–2022), American lawyer, jurist, and activist
- Adam Shand (born 1962), Australian writer and journalist
- Adam Shankman (born 1964), American director, actor, and choreographer
- Adam Shantry (born 1982), English cricketer
- Adam Shapiro (born 1972), American businessman and activist
- Adam Shapiro, American news anchor
- Adam Shareef, Maldivian politician
- Adam Sharples (born 1954), British executive, civil servant, and economist
- Adam Shaw (born 1957), American painter
- Adam Shaw, British business journalist and presenter
- Adam Shaw, drummer for the American punk rock band Lost City Angels
- Adam Baal Shem, Polish rabbi
- Adam Sherburne, American guitarist, vocalist, and music director for the band Consolidated
- Adam Sherlip (born 1984), American ice hockey coach
- Adam Sherrill (1697–1774), European American settler
- Adam Sherwin, British journalist and media correspondent
- Adam Shields (born 1977), Australian speedway rider
- Adam Shimmons (born 1972), English cricketer
- Adam Shoalts, Canadian writer
- Adam Shoemaker (born 1957), Canadian-Australian academic and administrator
- Adam Shoemaker, Egyptian-American Episcopal clergyman
- Adam Shoenfeld (born 1974), American guitarist, songwriter, and producer
- Adam Shortt (1859–1931), Canadian economic historian
- Adam Shreen (born 1993), Malaysian footballer
- Adam Shukri (1910–1983), Iraqi artist and architect
- Adam Shunk (born 1979), American high jumper
- Adam Siao Him Fa (born 2001), French figure skater
- Adam Sidlow (born 1987), English rugby league footballer
- Adam Sieff (born 1954), British music consultant and music industry executive
- Adam Siegel (born 1969), singer-songwriter, guitarist, bassist, producer, actor and graphic designer
- Adam C. Siepel (born 1972), American computational biologist
- Adam Hieronim Sieniawski (1576–1616), Polish-Lithuanian noble
- Adam Hieronim Sieniawski (1623/1624–1650), Polish noble
- Adam Silo (1674–1760), Dutch painter and author
- Adam Silver (born 1962), American businessman, lawyer, sports executive, and current commissioner of the National Basketball Association
- Adam Silvera (born 1990), American author
- Adam Simac (born 1983), Canadian volleyball player
- Adam Simmonds (born 1977), English police commissioner
- Adam Simon (born 1962), American director, producer, and screenwriter
- Ádám Simon (born 1990), Hungarian footballer
- Adam G. Simon (born 1977), American actor and screenwriter
- Adam Simpson (born 1976), Australian rules footballer
- Adam Sinagra (born 1995), Canadian football player
- Adam Sinclair (born 1977), Scottish film and television actor
- Adam Sinclair (born 1984), Indian field hockey player
- Adam Sioui (born 1982), Canadian swimmer
- Adam Sisman (born 1954), British writer, editor, and biographer
- Adam Skirving (1719–1803), Scottish songwriter
- Adam Skorek (born 1956), Polish-Canadian engineer and professor
- Adam Skórnicki (born 1976), Polish motorcycle speedway rider
- Adam Skrodzki (born 1983), Polish fencer
- Adam Skumawitz (born 1979), American soccer player, coach, and businessman
- Adam Skwarczyński (1886–1934), Polish independence activist and politician
- Adam Slater (born 1973), Australian rules footballer
- Adam Sławiński (born 1935), Polish composer
- Adam J. Slemmer (1828–1868), U.S. Army officer
- Adam Słodowy (1923–2019), Polish inventor, author, and television host
- Adam Small (1936–2016), South African writer and activist
- Adam Smalley (born 2001), British racing driver
- Adam Smarte (born 1987), Liberian footballer
- Adam Smelczyński (1930–2021), Polish trap shooter
- Adam Smethurst, English actor and writer
- Adam Smith (1723–1790), economist, philosopher, and author of The Wealth of Nations
- Adam Smith (1903–1985), American swimmer
- Adam Smith (1930–2014), pseudonym of American economics writer and commentator, George Goodman
- Adam Smith (born 1965), American politician
- Adam Smith (born 1971), English footballer and coach
- Adam Smith (born 1976), Canadian ice hockey player
- Adam Smith (born 1985), English footballer
- Adam Smith (born 1985), English footballer
- Adam Smith (born 1990), American football player
- Adam Smith (born 1991), English footballer
- Adam Smith (born 1992), American basketball player
- Adam Smith (born 1992), English footballer
- Adam Smith, British television director
- Adam Smith, American politician
- Adam Smith, English doctor and YouTuber
- Adam D. Smith, American computer scientist
- Adam Neal Smith, American actor, musician, and film producer
- Adam T. Smith, American professor and scientist
- Adam Smith-Neale (born 1993), English darts player
- Adam Smolarczyk (born 1994), Polish volleyball player
- Adam Smoluk (born 1980), Canadian screenwriter, director, actor, community leader, and executive
- Adam Smyth (born 1981), English cricketer
- Adam Snow, American record producer and electronic artist
- Adam Snyder (born 1982), American football player
- Adam W. Snyder (1799–1842), American politician
- Adam Clarke Snydor (1834–1896), American judge
- Adam Sobczak (born 1989), Polish rower
- Adam Levin Søbøtker (1753–1823), Danish estate owner
- Adam Sobel (born 1967), American mathematician and professor
- Adam Sofronijević (born 1973), Serbian library information specialist and professor
- Adam Soilleux (born 1991), English cricketer
- Adam Sol, Canadian-American poet
- Adam Soliman, Canadian researcher
- Adam Sollitt (born 1977), English football goalkeeper
- Adam Solomon (born 1963), Kenyan composer, guitarist, and singer
- Adam Solski (1895–1940), Polish Army major
- Adam Sopp (born 1986), British actor
- Adam Sørensen (born 2000), Danish footballer
- Adam Sowa (born 1957), Polish deputy chief executive of the European Defence Agency
- Adam Spencer (born 1969), Australian comedian, media personality, and radio presenter
- Adam Spencer (born 1972), Canadian curler
- Adam Spreadbury-Maher, Australian-Irish theatre artistic director, producer, and writer
- Adam Springfield (born 1982), American actor
- Adam Squire (died 1588), English churchman and academic
- Adam Stachowiak (born 1986), Polish football goalkeeper
- Adam Stachowiak (born 1989), Polish racing cyclist
- Adam Ståhl (born 1994), Swedish footballer
- Adam Stanger, American musician
- Adam Stankievič (1882–1949), Belarusian Roman Catholic priest, politician and writer
- Adam Stansfield (1978–2010), English footballer
- Adam Starchild (1946–2006), American financial consultant and convicted fraudster
- Adam Stark (1784–1867), English printer, bookseller, and antiquary
- Adam Starostka (born 1957), Polish sprinter
- Adam Starr (born 1973), Australian rugby league footballer
- Adam Stefanović (1832–1887), Serbian lithographer and painter
- Adam Stefanow (born 1994), Polish snooker player
- Adam Steffey (born 1965), American mandolin player
- Adam Stegerwald (1874–1945), German Catholic politician
- Adam Stein, American film director and screenwriter
- Adam Steinhardt (born 1969), Australian pole vaulter
- Adam Stejskal (born 2002), Czech football goalkeeper
- Adam Steltzner (born 1963), American NASA engineer
- Adam Stemple, American folk rock musician and author
- Adam Stenavich (born 1983), American football player and coach
- Adam Stennett (born 1972), American painter
- Adam Stephen (c. 1718–1791), Scottish-born doctor and military officer
- Adam Stephens, American guitarist, harmonicist, keyboarder, pianist, and vocalist for the duo Two Gallants
- Adam R. Steigert (born 1986), American filmmaker
- Adam Sterling (born 1983), American political scientist
- Adam Stern (born 1955), American conductor
- Adam Stern (born 1980), Canadian baseball player
- Adam Steuart (1591–1654), Scottish philosopher and controversialist
- Adam Stevens (born 1974), Australian hip hop artist, known professionally as Bias B
- Adam Stevens (born 1978), American racing crew chief
- Adam Stewart (born 1981), Jamaican businessman
- Adam Stewart (born 1987), New Zealand track cyclist
- Adam Stockhausen, American production designer
- Adam Stone, American political scientist and professor
- Adam Stonegrave (fl. 1341–1342), English Justice of the King's Bench
- Adam Storing, American politician
- Adam Storke (born 1962), American actor
- Adam Strachan (1987–2022), Scottish footballer
- Adam Straith (born 1990), Canadian soccer player
- Adam Streisand (born 1963), American lawyer
- Adam Strohm (1870–1951), Swedish-American librarian
- Adam Stronach, English Christian missionary
- Adam Struzik (born 1957), Polish doctor and politician
- Adam Studziński (1911–2008), Polish Roman Catholic priest
- Adam J. Sullivan, American politician
- Adam Sulzdorf-Liszkiewicz, American game designer and educator
- Adam Summerfield (born 1990), English ice hockey goaltender
- Adam Sušac (born 1989), Croatian footballer
- Adam Svensson (born 1993), Canadian golfer
- Adam Svoboda (1978–2019), Czech ice hockey goaltender and coach
- Adam Swandi (born 1996), Singaporean footballer
- Adam Sweeting, British rock critic and writer
- Adam Swift (born 1961), British political philosopher and sociologist
- Adam Swift (born 1993), English rugby league footballer
- Adam James Syddall (born 1980), English cricketer
- Adam Sýkora (born 2004), Slovak ice hockey player
- Adam P. Symson (born 1974), American businessman, CEO and president of the E. W. Scripps Company
- Ádám Szabó (footballer) (born 1988), Hungarian footballer
- Adam Szal (born 1953), Polish Roman Catholic bishop
- Ádám Szalai (born 1987), Hungarian footballer
- Adam Szejnfeld (born 1958), Polish politician
- Adam Szelągowski (1873–1961), Polish historian, teacher, and professor
- Adam Szentpétery (born 1956), Hungarian artist and professor
- Adam Szłapka (born 1984), Polish politician and political scientist
- Adam Szostkiewicz (born 1952), Polish author, religious commentator, political commentator, journalist, and translator
- Adam Sztaba (born 1975), Polish composer, music producer, conductor, arranger, pianist, and television personality
- Adam Sztykiel (born 1978), American television and film producer and screenwriter
- Adam Szubin, American politician and lawyer
- Adam Szustak (born 1978), Polish Roman Catholic priest, Dominican, itinerant preacher, academic chaplain, vlogger, and author
- Adam Szymański (1852–1916), Polish writer and lawyer
- Adam Szymczyk (born 1970), Polish art critic, curator, writer, and editor

=== T ===
- Adam Taaso, South African bishop
- Adam Tafralis (born 1983), American football player
- Adam Taggart (born 1993), Australian footballer
- Adam Taliaferro (born 1982), American politician and football player
- Adam Tambellini (born 1994), Canadian ice hockey player
- Adam Tandy, British television producer and director
- Adam Tangata (born 1991), Cook Islands rugby league footballer
- Adam Tann (born 1982), English footballer
- Adam Tanner (1572–1632), Austrian Jesuit theologian
- Adam Tanner (born 1973), English footballer
- Adam Tarnowski (1866–1946), Austro-Hungarian and Polish diplomat
- Adam Tarnowski (1892–1956), Austro-Hungarian and Polish diplomat and minister
- Adam Tarło (1713–1744), Polish nobleman
- Adam Tas (1668–1722), Dutch community leader
- Adam Tas (born 1981), South African singer and songwriter
- Adam Taub, American documentary film director
- Adam Taubitz (born 1967), German jazz and classical musician
- Adam Taylor (born 1991), Australian tennis player
- Adam Taylor, American composer
- Adam Russell Taylor, American human rights activist and minister
- Adam Tedder, British actor, singer-songwriter, and multi-instrumentalist musician
- Adam Tensta (born 1983), Swedish rapper, born Adam Momodou Eriksson Taal
- Adam Tepsurgayev (1976–2000), Chechen freelance cameraman
- Adam Terry (born 1982), American football player
- Adam Teuto, 14th-century German writer
- Adam Thibault (born 1990), Canadian football player
- Adam Christian Thebesius (1686–1732), German anatomist
- Adam Thielen (born 1990), American football player
- Adam Thirlwell (born 1978), British novelist
- Adam Thom (1802–1890), Scottish teacher, journalist, lawyer, public servant, and recorder
- Adam Thomas (born 1986), Welsh rugby union player
- Adam Thomas (born 1988), British actor
- Adam Thomas (born 1992), New Zealand footballer
- Adam Thomas, American politician
- Adam Thompson (born 1982), New Zealand tennis player
- Adam Thompson (born 1992), English footballer
- Adam David Thompson, American actor
- Adam Thompstone (born 1987), English rugby union player
- Adam Thomson (born 1955), British diplomat
- Adam Thomson (born 1982), New Zealand rugby union player
- Adam Thomson (born 1986), Australian rules footballer
- Adam Bruce Thomson (1885–1976), Scottish painter
- Adam S. T. Thomson (1908–2000), Scottish engineer and university administrator
- Adam Thorn (born 1979), American musician and songwriter
- Adam Thoroughgood (1604–1640), English colonist and community leader in the Virginia Colony
- Adam Thorpe (born 1956), British poet and novelist
- Adam Thoseby (born 1991), British-Australian basketball player
- Adam Tickell (born 1965), British economic geographer
- Adam Tihany (born 1948), Romanian-American hospitality designer
- Adam Tilander (born 1998), Swedish ice hockey player
- Adam Tillcock (born 1993), English cricketer
- Adam Timmerman (born 1971), American football player
- Adam Tinley (born 1967), English DJ, musician, singer, and record producer, known professionally as Adamski
- Adam Tinworth (born 1971), English journalist, writer, and role-playing game designer
- Adam Tippett (born 1979), Australian rugby league footballer
- Adam Tokarz (1944–2014), Polish footballer
- Adam Toledo (2007/2008–2021), Mexican-American boy fatally shot by police
- Adam Tomasiak (born 1953), Polish rower
- Adam Tomkins (born 1969), British academic and politician
- Adam Tomlinson (born 1993), Australian rules footballer
- Adam Tooze (born 1967), English historian and professor
- Adam Topolski (born 1951), Polish footballer
- Adam Torrence (1732–1780), Irish-American businessman and soldier
- Adam Torres, American singer and songwriter
- Adam Johan Frederik Poulsen Trampe (1798–1876), Dano-Norwegian lawyer and politician
- Adam Trautman (born 1997), American football player
- Adam Treloar (born 1993), Australian rules footballer
- Adam Trenčan (born 1990), Slovak ice hockey goaltender
- Adam Treu (born 1974), American football player
- Adam von Trott zu Solz (1909–1944), German lawyer and diplomat who opposed the Nazi regime
- Adam Trupish (born 1979), Canadian boxer
- Adam Tse (born 1990), Hong Kong footballer
- Adam Tsekhman, Canadian actor
- Adam Tsuei (born 1959), Chinese entrepreneur, film producer, and director
- Adam Tučný (born 2002), Slovak footballer
- Adam Tuominen (born 1980), Australian actor
- Adam Tutbury (died ca. 1400), English politician and merchant
- Adam Tyc (born 1986), Czech sport shooter
- Adam Tzanetopoulos (born 1995), Greek footballer

=== U ===
- Adam Ulam (1922–2000), Polish-American historian and political scientist
- Adam Ulatoski (born 1985), American football player
- Adam Heinrich Wilhelm Uloth (1804–1885), German politician

=== V ===
- Adam Václavík (born 1994), Czech biathlete
- Adam Valdez, American visual effects supervisor
- Adam van Breen (1585–1642), Dutch painter
- Adam Frans van der Meulen (1632–1690), Flemish painter and draughtsman
- Adam van Dommele (born 1984), Australian footballer
- Adam van Düren, German sculptor and architect
- Adam van Koeverden (born 1982), Canadian sprint kayaker and politician
- Adam van Noort (1561/1962–1641), Flemish painter, draughtsman, and teacher
- Adam van Vianen (1568–1627), Dutch silversmith, engraver, and medalist
- Adam Varadi (born 1985), Czech footballer
- Adam Vaughan (born c. 1961), Canadian political journalist and politician
- Adam Vayer (born 1987), Israeli footballer
- Adam Swart Vedder (1834–1905), Canadian politician and rancher
- Adam S. Veige, American chemist and professor
- Adam Vella (born 1971), Australian sport shooter
- Adam Vetulani (1901–1976), Polish historian of medieval law
- Adam Veyde (1667–1720), Russian infantry general
- Adam Sayf Viacava (born 1999), known simply as Sayf, Italian rapper
- Adam Vidjeskog (born 1998), Finnish footballer
- Adam Viktora (born 1996), Czech swimmer
- Adam Vinatieri (born 1972), American football player
- Adam Virgo (born 1983), English footballer
- Adam Vishnyakov (born 1991), Russian footballer
- Adam Vlkanova (born 1994), Czech footballer
- Adam Voges (born 1979), Australian cricketer
- Adam Vojtěch (born 1986), Czech politician and lawyer
- Adam von Bodenstein (1528–1577), Swiss Paracelsian alchemist and physician
- Adam von Trautmannsdorf (1579–1617), Croatian and Austrian Littoral general
- Adam von Trott zu Solz (1909–1944), German lawyer and diplomat
- Adam Georg von Agthe (1777–1826), Russian Imperial Russian Army Major General
- Adam Abraham von Gaffron und Oberstradam (1665–1738), Silesian nobleman, officer of the Danish army
- Adam Gottlob von Krogh (1768–1839), Norwegian-Danish military officer
- Adam Johann von Krusenstern (1770–1846), Baltic-German admiral and explorer
- Adam Friedrich von Seinsheim (1708–1779), Prince-Bishop of Würzburg and Prince-Bishop of Bamberg
- Adam Heinrich von Steinau (died 1712), Saxon Generalfeldmarschall
- Adam Edward Vrooman (1847–1923), Canadian physician and politician

=== W ===
- Adam Waczyński (born 1989), Polish basketball player
- Adam Wade (1935–2022), American singer, musician, and actor
- Adam Wade (born 1968), American drummer
- Adam Wade, American storyteller
- Adam Wadecki (born 1977), Polish racing cyclist
- Adam Wagner, British lawyer and politician
- Adam C. Wagner (1858/1860–1935), American architect and engineer
- Adam Willis Wagnalls (1843–1924), American dictionary publisher
- Adam Wainwright (born 1981), American baseball player
- Adam Wakeman (born 1974), English keyboard player
- Adam Wakenshaw (1914–1942), English recipient of the Victoria Cross
- Adam Walczak (born 1957), Polish footballer
- Adam Walinsky (born 1937), American lawyer and politician
- Adam Walker (1829–1902), Australian politician
- Adam Walker (born 1963), American football player
- Adam Walker (born 1968), American football player
- Adam Walker (born 1969), British politician
- Adam Walker (born 1986), Scottish ice hockey player and coach
- Adam Walker (born 1987), English flautist
- Adam Walker (1991–2022), Scottish rugby league player
- Adam Walker (born 1991), English footballer
- Adam Walker, Canadian politician
- Adam Wallace (born 1981), English footballer
- Adam Wallace-Harrison (born 1979), Australian rugby union player
- Adam Walne (born 1990), English rugby league footballer
- Adam Walsh (1974–1981), American murder victim
- Adam Walsh (American football) (1901–1985), American football player and coach
- Adam Walters, Australian journalist
- Adam Walton (born 1971), British radio disc jockey
- Adam WarRock (born 1980), American rapper, born as Eugene K. Ahn
- Adam Ward (born 1986), American baseball player and coach
- Adam Ward (1988–2015), American murder victim
- Adam Kelly Ward (1982–2016), American convicted murderer executed by lethal injection
- Adam Warren (born 1967), American comic book writer and artist
- Adam Warren (born 1975), English cricketer
- Adam Warren (born 1987), American baseball pitcher
- Adam Warren (born 1991), Welsh rugby union player
- Adam Warwick (born 1977), Australian rugby league footballer
- Adam Waszkiewicz (born 1993), Polish footballer
- Adam Watene (1977–2008), Cook Islands rugby league footballer
- Adam Watson (1914–2007), British International relations theorist and researcher
- Adam Watson (1930–2019), Scottish biologist, ecologist, and mountaineer
- Adam Watt (born 1967), Australian boxer and kickboxer
- Adam Watts (born 1975), American singer-songwriter
- Adam Watts (born 1988), English footballer
- Adam Wawrosz (1913–1971), Polish poet, writer, and activist
- Adam Ważyk (1905–1982), Polish poet, essayist, and writer
- Adam Weber (born 1987), American football player
- Adam Webster (born 1980), English footballer
- Adam Webster (born 1995), English footballer
- Adam Ditlev Wedell-Wedellsborg (1782–1827), Dano-Norwegian politician
- Adam Gottlieb Weigen (1677–1727), German pietist, theologian, and animal rights writer
- Adam Weiler (died 1894), German trade unionist and socialist activist
- Adam D. Weinberg, American museum curator and director
- Adam S. Weinberg (born 1965), American sociologist, academic administrator, and businessman
- Adam Weiner (born 1975), Polish handball goalkeeper
- Adam Weishaupt (1748–1830), founder of the Order of Illuminati
- Adam Weisman (born 1986), American actor and mortician
- Adam Weiss, Slovenian politician
- Adam Weissel (1854–1928), American U.S. Navy sailor and Medal of Honor recipient
- Adam Weisweiler (c. 1750– after 1810), French cabinetmaker
- Adam Weitsman, American entrepreneur and businessman
- Adam Cleghorn Welch (1864–1943), Scottish clergyman and biblical scholar
- Adam Wenceslaus, Duke of Cieszyn (1574–1617), Duke of Cieszyn
- Adam Werbach (born 1973), American environmental activist, author, and entrepreneur
- Adam Werner (born 1997), Swedish ice hockey goaltender
- Adam Werritty (born 1978), Scottish businessman
- Adam West (1928–2017), American television actor
- Adam West (born 1986), American soccer player
- Adam Wexler (born 1956), American-Israeli musician
- Adam Wharton (born 2004), English footballer
- Adam Wheater (born 1990), English cricketer
- Adam Wheeler (born 1980), Australian rugby league footballer
- Adam Wheeler (wrestler) (born 1981), American wrestler
- Adam White (c. 1630–1708), Scottish Presbyterian minister
- Adam White (1817–1878), Scottish zoologist
- Adam White (1823–1895), Swiss-American soldier and Medal of Honor recipient
- Adam White (born 1976), Australian rules footballer and filmmaker
- Adam White (born 1989), Australian volleyball player
- Adam Whitehead (born 1980), British swimmer
- Adam Whitelock (born 1987), New Zealand rugby union footballer
- Adam Bergmark Wiberg (born 1997), Swedish footballer
- Adam Wicheard (born 1985), English snooker player
- Adam Wickmer (died 1384), English priest and academic
- Adam Wieczorek (born 1992), Polish mixed martial artist
- Adam Wielomski (born 1972), Polish scientist and professor
- Adam Wiercioch (born 1980), Polish fencer
- Adam Wierman (born 1979), American computer scientist and professor
- Adam Wilcox (born 1976), British racing driver
- Adam Wilcox (born 1992), American ice hockey goaltender
- Adam Wildavsky (born 1960), American bridge player
- Adam Wilde (born 1979), English footballer
- Adam Wilk (born 1987), American baseball pitcher
- Adam Wilk (born 1997), Polish footballer
- Adam Willaerts (1577–1664), Dutch painter
- Adam Willard (born 1973), American drummer, known by the stage name Atom Willard
- Adam Willett (born 1982), American boxer
- Adam Williams (1922–2006), American film and TV actor, born Adam Berg
- Adam Williams (born 1983), British basketball player
- Adam Williams, American baseball player
- Adam Williamson (born 1984), American soccer man
- Adam Willis (born 1976), English footballer
- Adam Willits (born 1972), Australian actor
- Adam Wilsby (born 2000), Swedish ice hockey player
- Adam Wilson (judge) (1814–1891), Canadian lawyer, judge, and politician
- Adam Wilson, British bassist for the post-Britpop band Thirteen Senses
- Adam Wiltzie (born 1969), American-Belgian composer and sound engineer
- Adam Wingard (born 1982), American film director, editor, cinematographer, and writer
- Adam Winkler (born 1967), American lawyer and professor
- Adam Winsler, American developmental psychologist
- Adam Winslow (born 1979 or 1980), British businessman
- Adam Wise (1943–2008), English Royal Air Force pilot
- Adam Wishart (born 1969), British documentary filmmaker
- Adam Wiśniewski (born 1980), Polish handballer
- Adam Wiśniewski-Snerg (1937–1995), Polish author
- Adam Wiśniowiecki (c. 1566–1622), Polish-Lithuanian nobleman
- Adam Włodek (1922–1986), Polish poet, editor, and translator
- Adam Wodnicki (1930–2020), Polish professor, writer, and translator
- Adam Wojciechowski (born 1980), Polish rower
- Adam Wójcik (1970–2017), Polish basketball player
- Adam Wolanin (1919–1987), Polish-American soccer player
- Adam Wolańczyk (1936–2022), Polish actor
- Adam Wolff (1899–1984), Polish historian and sailor
- Adam Wolniewicz (born 1993), Polish footballer
- Adam Wong (born 1985), Canadian gymnast
- Adam Wonus, American real estate developer
- Adam Wood (born 1955), British diplomat and politician
- Adam Woodbury (born 1994), American basketball player
- Adam Woodward, British actor and model
- Adam Woodyatt (born 1968), English actor
- Adam Wool, American politician
- Adam T. Woolley, American chemist and professor
- Adam Woolnough (born 1982), Australian rugby league footballer
- Adam Woronowicz (born 1973), Polish actor
- Adam Worth (1844–1902), German-born American bank robber and mob boss
- Adam Woźnica (born 1994), Polish volleyball player
- Adam Wright (1975–1998), Australian rugby league footballer
- Adam Wright (born 1977), American water polo player
- Adam Wurtzel (born 1985), American television personality, host, and producer
- Adam Wybe (1584–1653), Dutch engineer and inventor
- Adam Wylie (born 1984), American actor
- Adam Wysocki (born 1974), Polish sprint canoeist

=== Y ===
- Adam Yacenda (1915–1986), American newspaper publisher and political advisor
- Adam Yamaguchi, American television journalist and producer
- Adam Yarmolinsky (1922–2000), American academic, educator, and author
- Adam Yates (born 1983), English footballer
- Adam Yates (born 1992), English racing cyclist
- Adam Yauch (1964–2012), American rapper and member of the Beastie Boys, known professionally as MCA
- Adam Baako Nortey Yeboah (born 1950), Ghanaian politician and manager
- Adam J. Yeend (born 1980), Australian actor and producer
- Adam Yosef (born 1981), British multimedia journalist, photojournalist, and community activist
- Adam Young (born 1982), American politician
- Adam Young, American singer-songwriter and member of the electronic project Owl City

=== Z ===
- Adam Ignacy Zabellewicz (1784–1831), Polish professor
- Adam Zagajewski (1945–2021), Polish poet, novelist, translator and essayist
- Adam Zajíček (born 1993), Czech volleyball player
- Adam Zalužanský ze Zalužan (c. 1555–1613), Czech-Bohemian botanist, physician, and professor
- Adam Zameenzad (1937–2017), Pakistani-British writer
- Adam Zamenhof (1888–1940), Polish doctor, Holocaust victim
- Adam Zamoyski (born 1949), English historian
- Adam Žampa (born 1990), Slovak alpine ski racer
- Adam Zampa (born 1992), Australian cricketer
- Adam A. Zango (born 1985), Nigerian actor, singer, dancer, scriptwriter, director, film producer, television personality, and philanthropist
- Adam Zaruba (born 1991), Canadian football player
- Adam Zavacký (born 1988), Slovak sprinter
- Adam Zawislak, Polish Paralympic volleyball player
- Adam Zbar (born 1969), American entrepreneur
- Adam Zbořil (born 1995), Czech ice hockey player
- Adam Zdrójkowski (born 2000), Polish actor and television presenter
- Adam Zeis (born 1978), American writer and podcaster
- Adam Zejer (born 1963), Polish footballer
- Adam Zeman (ice hockey) (born 1991), Czech ice hockey player
- Adam Zeman (neurologist) (born 1957), British neurologist
- Adam Zemke (born 1983), American politician
- Adam Zertal (1936–2015), Israeli archaeologist and professor
- Adam Zimarino (born 2001), Australian footballer
- Adam Zimmer (born 1984), American football coach
- Adam Zimmerman (1852–1919), Canadian politician
- Adam Zindani (born 1972), English rhythm guitarist
- Adam Zolotin (born 1983), American actor
- Adam Zotovich, American stage performer and producer
- Adam Zreľák (born 1994), Slovak footballer
- Adam Zrinski (1662–1691), Croatian count and army officer
- Adam Zucker (born 1976), American sportscaster
- Adam Friedrich Zürner (1679–1742), German cartographer and geographer
- Adam Zwar (born 1972), Australian actor, voice actor, and writer
- Adam Zyglis (born 1982), American cartoonist

== Fictional characters ==
- Adam, a character in Buffy the Vampire Slayer
- Adam Barlow, character on the British soap opera Coronation Street
- Adam Barton, on the British soap opera Emmerdale
- Adam Best, on the British soap opera EastEnders
- Adam Cameron, character from the Australian soap opera Home and Away
- Adam Carrington, on the television show Dynasty
- Adam Carter, from the BBC television espionage show Spooks
- Adam Cartwright, character from western TV series Bonanza
- Adam Chandler, on the American soap opera All My Children
- Adam Cooper, on the Australian police drama series Blue Heelers
- Adam Dalgliesh, protagonist of mystery novels by P. D. James
- Adam Eddington, major character in multiple novels by Madeleine L'Engle
- Adam Heywood, character on the New Zealand soap opera Shortland Street
- Adam Link, humanoid robot in the short stories of Eando Binder
- Adam Mitchell, from Doctor Who
- Adam Newman, in the American soap opera The Young and the Restless
- Adam Ross, a main character in CSI: NY
- Adam Schiff, on the American TV show Law & Order
- Adam Strange, DC Comics superhero
- Adam Warlock, a Marvel Comics character
- Adam West, character in the American animated television series Family Guy, voiced by Adam West
- Adam Willis, on the Australian soap opera Neighbours
- Adam X, a Marvel Comics character
- Black Adam, born Teth-Adam, a supervillain and occasional antihero from DC Comics
- Prince Adam, the alter ego of He-Man in the animated TV series
- Prince Adam, the Beast's true human form in Disney's 1991 animated and 2017 live-action films
- Prince Adam, the heir to the Royal Empire in the 2016 comic book series Empress from Icon Comics

== See also ==
- Adem, given name
- Adaam (born 2002), Swedish rapper
