= Adam Jastrzebski =

Adam Jastrzębski (IXI COLOR, Adam-X) was born 1980 in Płock, Poland. He graduated from History of Art at the University of Warsaw and has become a member of massmix collective and vlepvnet community. He is known as a painter, performer, independent art curator and theoretician, Who is obsessed with evolution and quantum physics.

There are many opposite features gathered in the same place to give character to Jastrzębski's art: Natural and artificial, alive and dead, orderly and random. His art is self-referential and establishes a fundamental reflection on the construction of a work of art. Form, color, scale, and space are the main media for him to conduct a study of the central issues of the build, tangibility and morphology of an “artistic body”. The morphology of the works in Jastrzębski's concept is not only about a result of theoretical reflection on the subject of art, but also a “point of arrival” of a movement involving a deep exploration of form.

During his artistic work, Jastrzębski has been active under two different pseudonyms. Between 2003 and 2008, he used the pseudonym Adam-X to create a series of projects in public space, mainly murals and street tags. Since 2008 under another pseudonym Ixi Color he has made a number of temporary interventions project in public space, often engaged with performances.

Vinyl has been Jastrzębski's most important project so far. He applied Vinyl foil on plexiglass in an appearance of bacteria culture growing under a microscope. The ongoing project of building pictorial objects is based on two technical principles: growth and accumulation. It explains how the smallest particles in laboratory conditions are not entirely under our control, how natural processes shape an entirely artificial reality, and how our understanding of the world is being tested today.

Jastrzębski has exhibited his works in many galleries in Poland such as Propaganda Gallery, Arsenale Gallery, Interview Gallery, Center for Contemporary Art Ujazdowski Castle. Currently he lives and works in Warsaw.
