= Adam Purpis =

Soviet intelligence agent

Adam Purpis (Russian: Адам Пурпис; sometimes transliterated as "Purpiss"; born 14 March 1883), a Latvian, was an employee of Wostwag, or the Eastern Trading Company, which was used by Soviet military intelligence as a source of foreign currency and to provide cover for agents abroad.

In the late 1930s, Purpis, who sometimes travelled on a Honduras passport, served as the business head of a Wostwag subsidiary, the Far Eastern Fur Trading Company, in Tientsin. British intelligence suspected, but never proved, that he was himself a Soviet intelligence agent.
