= Adam Hildreth =

British entrepreneur (born 1985)

- Born: March 25, 1985 (age 41); Leeds, West Yorkshire, England
- Occupation: Entrepreneur

Adam Hildreth (born 25 March 1985 in Leeds, West Yorkshire, England) is a British entrepreneur. Hildreth co-founded data firm Dubit Limited when he was 14. Hildreth also founded and was CEO of Crisp, a company that managed user-generated content on behalf of other companies. Crisp was acquired by in 2022 by US-based Kroll. The business was subsequently renamed as Resolver.

According to the "Sunday Times Rich List 2014", Hildreth was worth £24 million as of 2014. In a 2003 study of British millionaires of the future, Hildreth was predicted to be worth £40 million by the year 2020. Hildreth has been awarded the Yorkshire Young Achievers Award.
