= Dlouhý =

Dlouhý (feminine: Dlouhá) is a Czech surname, meaning 'long'. It was created based on the appearance of the bearer of the name. Notable people with the surname include:

- Adam Dlouhý (born 1994), Czech ice hockey player
- Bedřich Dlouhý (1932–2025), Czech painter and academic
- Lukáš Dlouhý (born 1983), Czech tennis player
- Oliver Dlouhý (born 1988), Czech businessman
- Radek Dlouhý (born 1982), Czech ice hockey player
- Vladimír Dlouhý (actor) (1958–2010), Czech actor
- Vladimír Dlouhý (politician) (born 1953), Czech politician
