= Bedřich Dlouhý =

Czech painter (1932–2025)

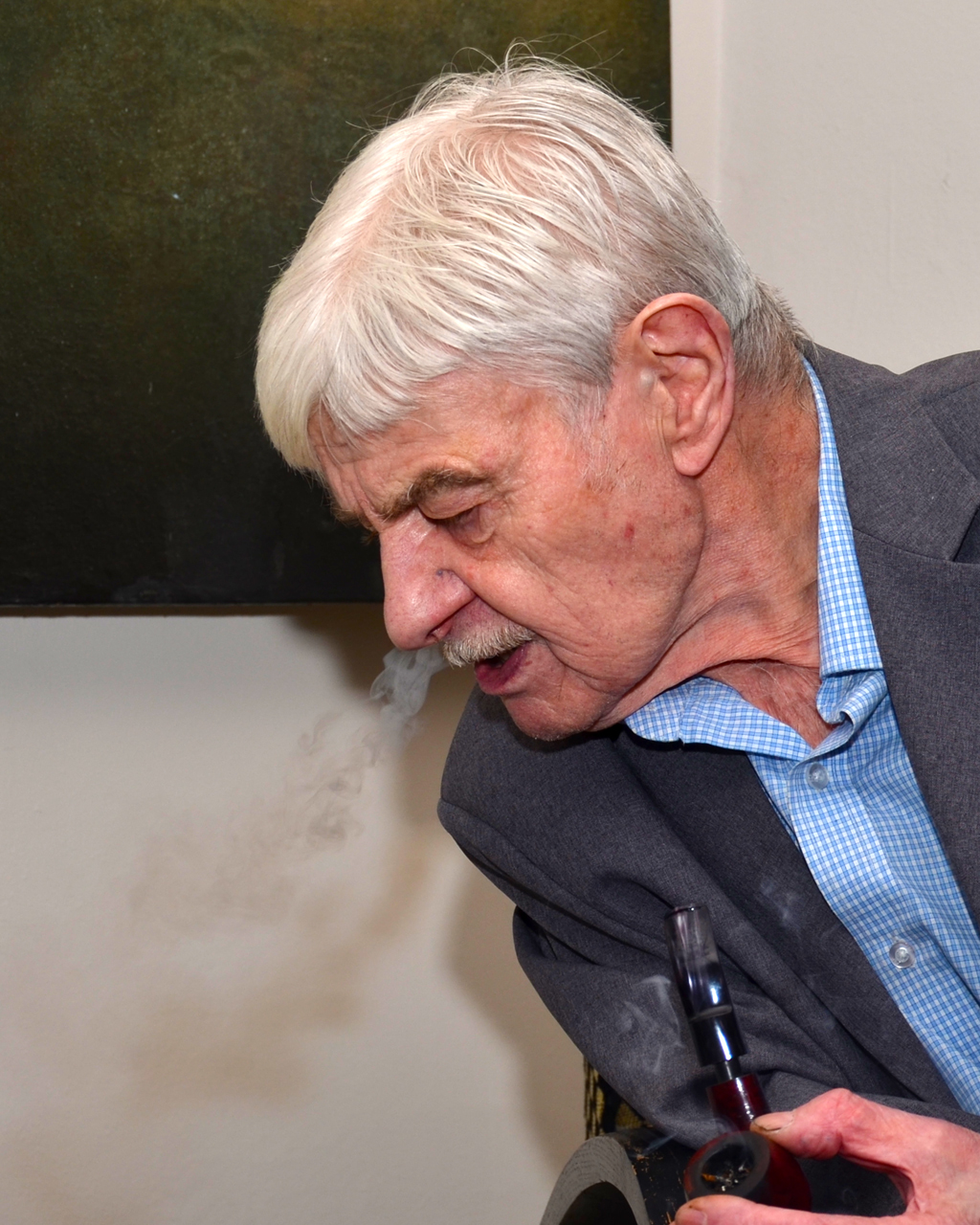
- Dlouhý in 2015
- Born: 2 August 1932; Plzeň, Czechoslovakia
- Died: 30 May 2025 (aged 92); Prague, Czech Republic
- Education: Academy of Fine Arts in Prague
- Notable work: The Lacemaker (1986), Museum Kampa
- Awards: Main prize for painting, Quatrième Biennale de Paris (1965); Gold Medal of the Academy of Fine Arts in Prague (1996)

Bedřich Dlouhý (2 August 1932 – 30 May 2025) was Czech painter and a professor at the Academy of Fine Arts in Prague.

== Life and career ==
Bedřich Dlouhý's family moved from Plzeň to Most, and after the annexation of Sudetenland in 1938, settled in Prague. His father, formerly a newspaper editor, was arrested at the beginning of the German occupation and executed in 1941. In 1947 Bedřich Dlouhý became a trainee at Upak-Krutý ceramics manufacturer, before studying at the State Vocational Ceramics School (1949–1952), where he met Karel Nepraš.

Dlouhý then studied painting in Miloslav Holý's studio at the Academy of Fine Arts in Prague (1952–1957). In 1957 he was expelled for political reasons and sent to North Bohemia, where he worked as a labourer. A year later, at Professor Holý's request, Dlouhý was allowed to return to the Academy, and finished his studies in Karel Souček's studio (1959).

Alongside Karel Nepraš, Jan Koblasa and Rudolf Komorous, Bedřich Dlouhý was a founding member of the Club (1954) and later of the group called Šmidra group (1957). In the dangerous years of Stalinist repression in the 1950s, Bedřich Dlouhý and his friends from the Šmidra group organised various non-art and pataphysical projects such as the Malmuzherciáda exhibition (1954), a collective absurdist novel called Moroa – A Tale of Great Woe, starting their own brass band and the Palette of the Motherland Ice Hockey Club (1962), a production of the play The Incendiary's Daughter, and a special event at the Reduta jazz club to commemorate the naïve poet Václav Svoboda Plumlovský, while during their mandatory Marxism lessons at the Academy they would draw humorous pictures. Dlouhý graduated in portrait and figure painting in 1959. He was conscripted in 1960, and on returning to Prague he found his first studio in Žižkov, where in 1962 he held a private exhibition of his work.

In 1965 Dlouhý was awarded one of the six main prizes at the IV^{e} Biennale Internationale des Jeunes Artistes de Paris, allowing him to spend half a year studying in France. The exhibition by five Czech artists at the Biennale was described as an important discovery. After the Warsaw Pact invasion of Czechoslovakia in 1968, Dlouhý fell ill and ceased painting till 1970. In 1972 he married Vlasta Bláhová (born 1945), an economist and artist. During the normalization era he was not allowed to exhibit his art, and he worked instead as an external designer for Trade Organization Artcentrum and occasionally as a graphic artist for exhibition organisers.

In 1981 Dlouhý, Hugo Demartini and Theodor Pištěk organised a get-together and one-day exhibition for artists, critics and friends at Dlouhý's country retreat, former millhouse in Netvořice. On his 50th birthday in 1983 he had his first opportunity to show his work in Prague, at Vincenc Kramář Gallery; the exhibition broke visitor records and was widely reviewed in the press.

In 1987 he was a founding member of the group The Odd Ones, with whom he continued to exhibit until 1992. In 1990 he was appointed to a professorship of painting at the Academy of Fine Arts in Prague.

Dlouhý lived and worked in Prague. In 2020 he had a large retrospective exhibition of his work at Prague City Gallery.

Dlouhý died on 30 May 2025, at the age of 92.

=== Awards ===
- 1965 Main prize for painting, Quatrième Biennale de Paris
- 1990 grant from the Pollock-Krasner Foundation, USA
- 1996 Gold Medal of the Academy of Fine Arts in Prague (for teaching and contribution to Academy reform)
- 1998 Medal for Art, by the European Circle of Friends of Franz Kafka in Prague

== Work ==
The 1950s left their mark on Bedřich Dlouhý's drawings from the Academy and his early paintings, which have a specific and bleak sense of humour and an aesthetic that defined itself in opposition not to official art (which he thought ridiculous and unworthy of attention), but to the other pressures the communist regime brought to bear (The Romantics' Promenade, 1958). In the early 1960s his entire generation turned to Art Informel, with its radical abstraction, anti-aesthetic expressive painting and unconventional materials.

Dlouhý exhibited his Art Informel works (1960–1962) in his studio in 1962. Rather than structural abstract expressionism, these paintings (e.g. Red Landscape) resemble “inner landscapes”, as defined by Mikuláš Medek's work at this time. Dlouhý included small objects in his existential Art Informel paintings, which blended irony with black humour (Wall, 1960; Pressure Test, 1962–1963).

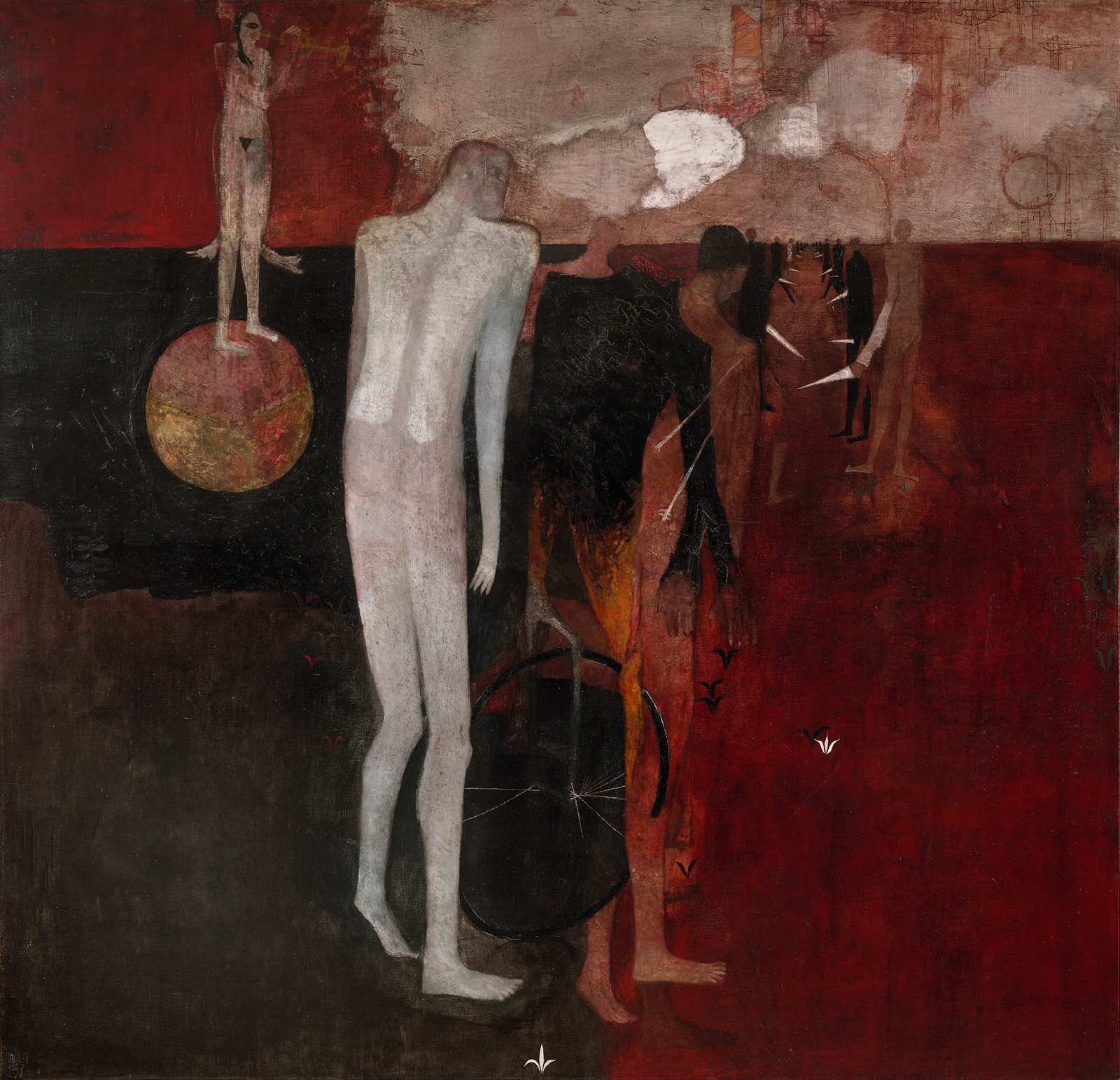
The Romantics' Promenade (1958), Gallery of the Central Bohemian Region

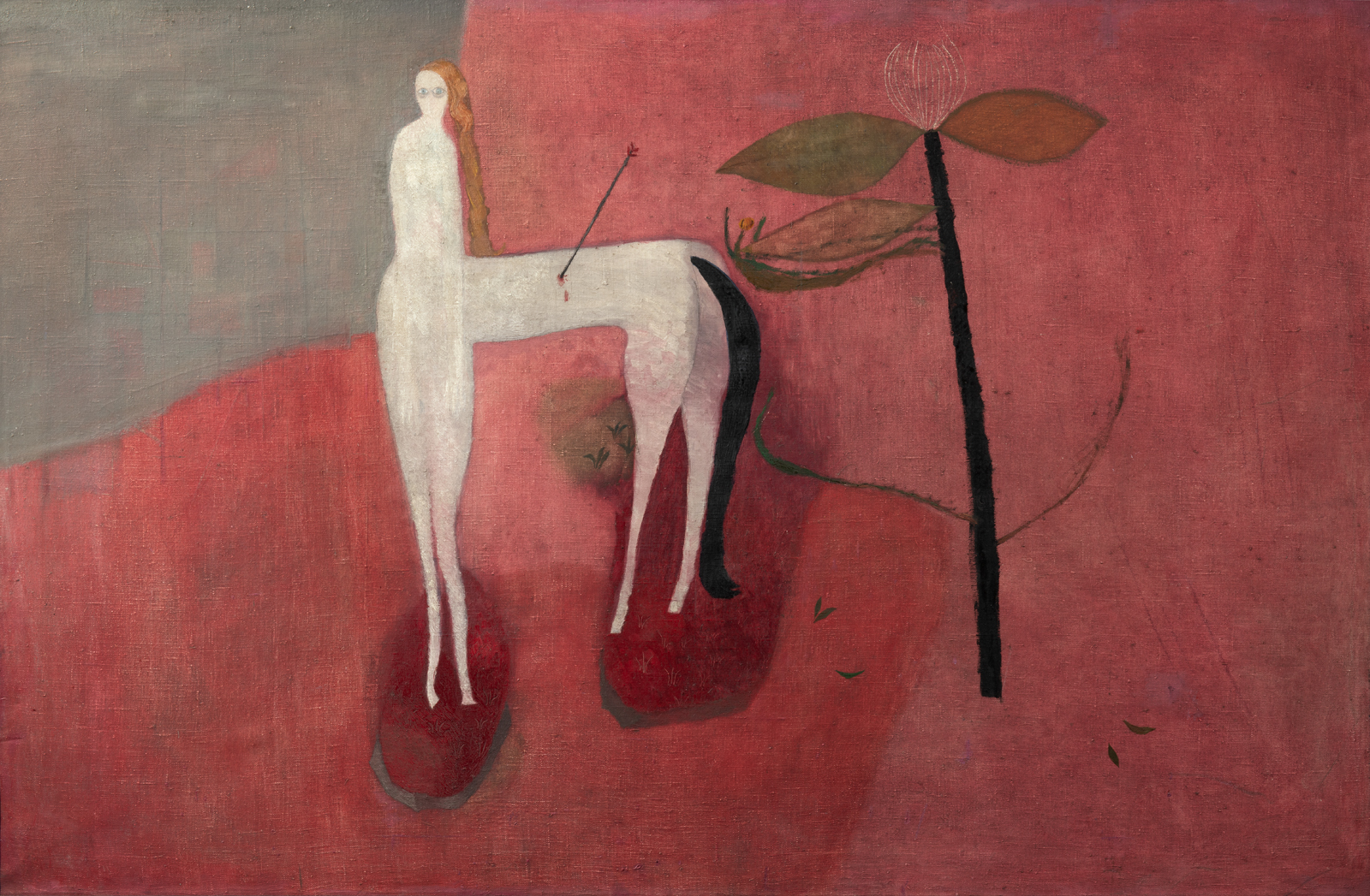
Hunter's Rondo (1959), Museum Montanelli

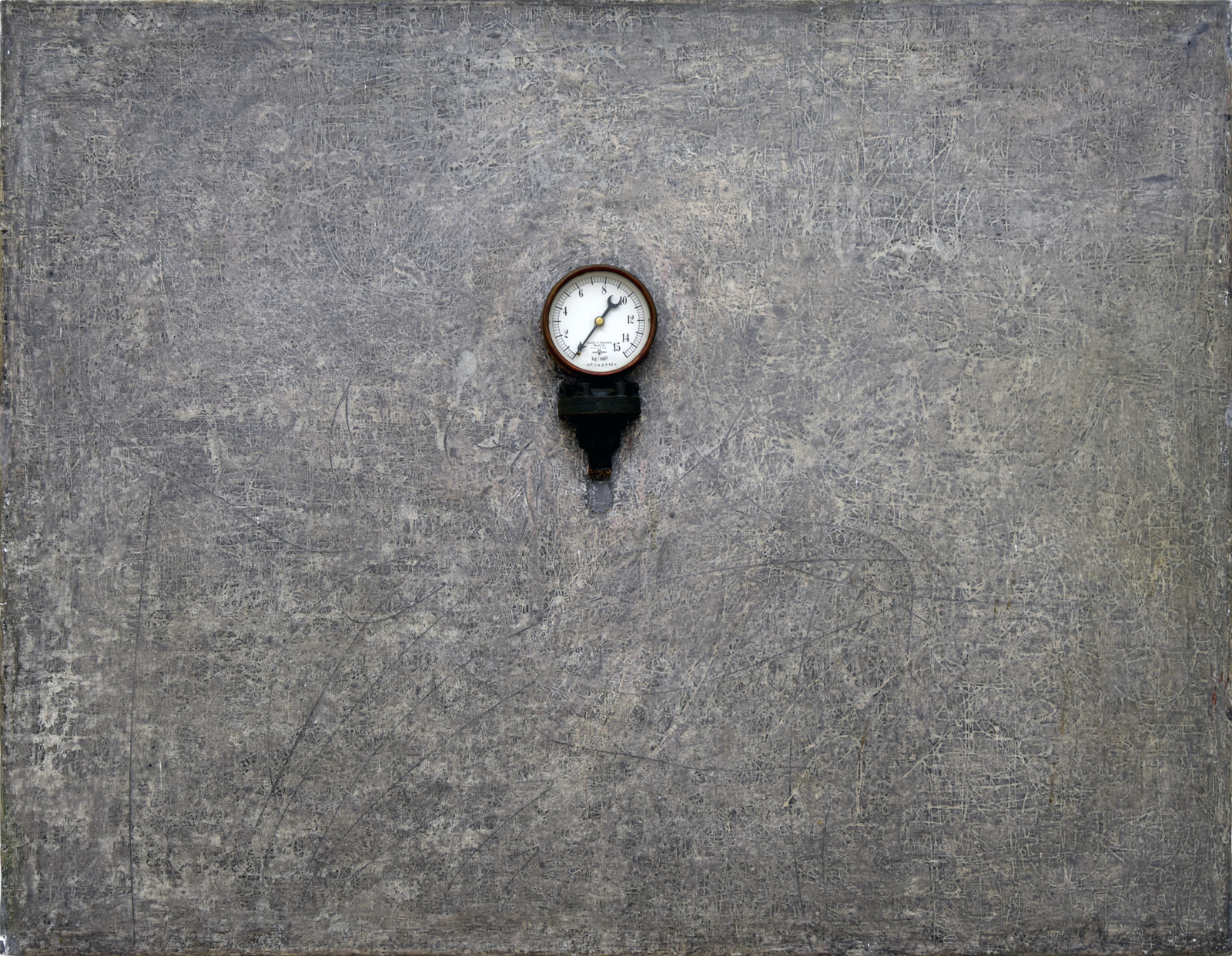
Pressure Test (1962-1963)

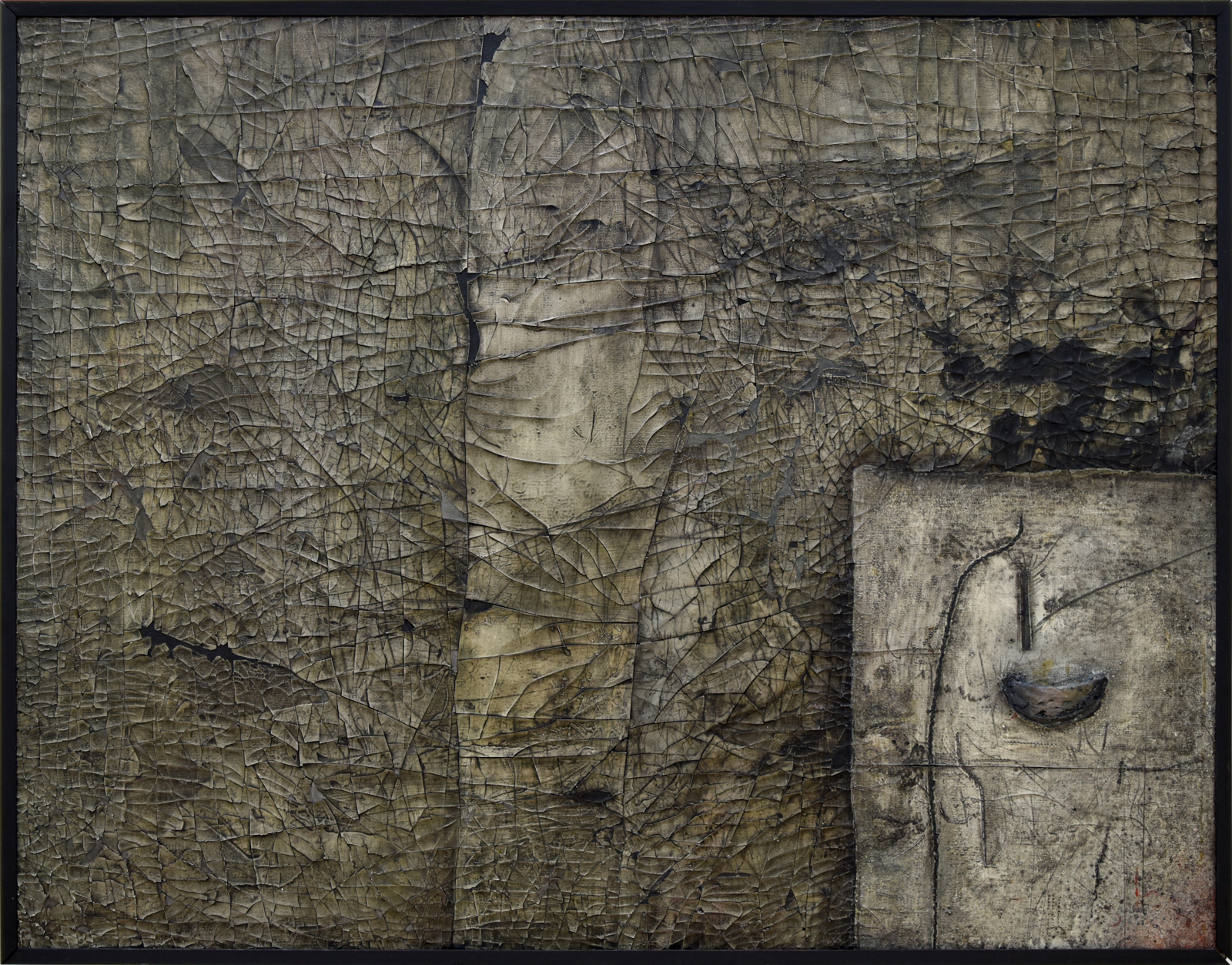
Wall (1962-1963)

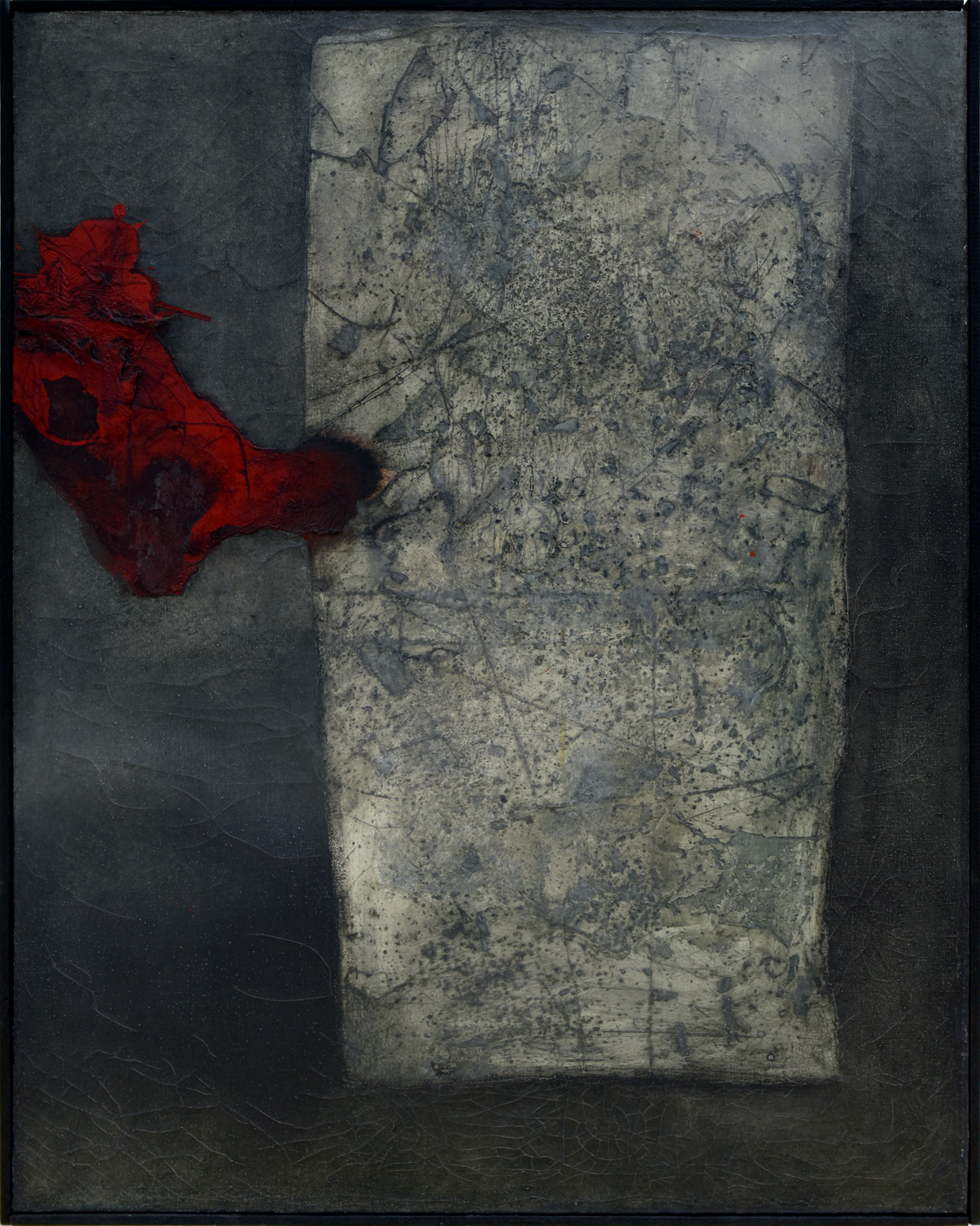
Grey series - Painting No. 3 (1962)

Concurrently, Dlouhý developed his version of the “aesthetics of the bizarre”, often with minor wilfulness hidden in details and sarcastic comments of the reality. Common to all these works was the rejection of art's imitative function and the emphasising of its autonomous existence, using specific objects for their visual, rather than semantic qualities. The magic of these works lies mainly in the tension between their matter-of-factness and the suggestion of mysterious content within. Critics in the 1960s saw a connection with Rudolphine Mannerism in the artificial perfection, refinement, hermeticism and bizarreness of Bedřich Dlouhý's paintings, and they compared his art with the Phases movement, contemporary works by the Surrealist Group and the artists featured at the Mythologies quotidiennes exhibition in Paris.

Around the mid-1960s Dlouhý was one of the artists working with material art and the hanging object. He was part of an exhibition The History and Present of Montage, Objects, Assemblage and Material Art at the Václav Špála Gallery in Prague. The items he incorporated into his objects, originally just simple applied materials, gradually became semantically independent, e.g. as glass reliquaries (Moroa as a Preacher, 1965), and increasingly three-dimensional (Machine for Making Things Worse, 1967).

The Models series from the late 1960s emphasises the significance of the object (an assemblage in a perspex box), while painting plays a lesser role as an illusionistic backdrop (Model of Everything Possible, Mainly a Great Journey, 1969; Sky No. 4, 1971). Dlouhý constantly examines whether “the picture plane is sufficient to say everything”.

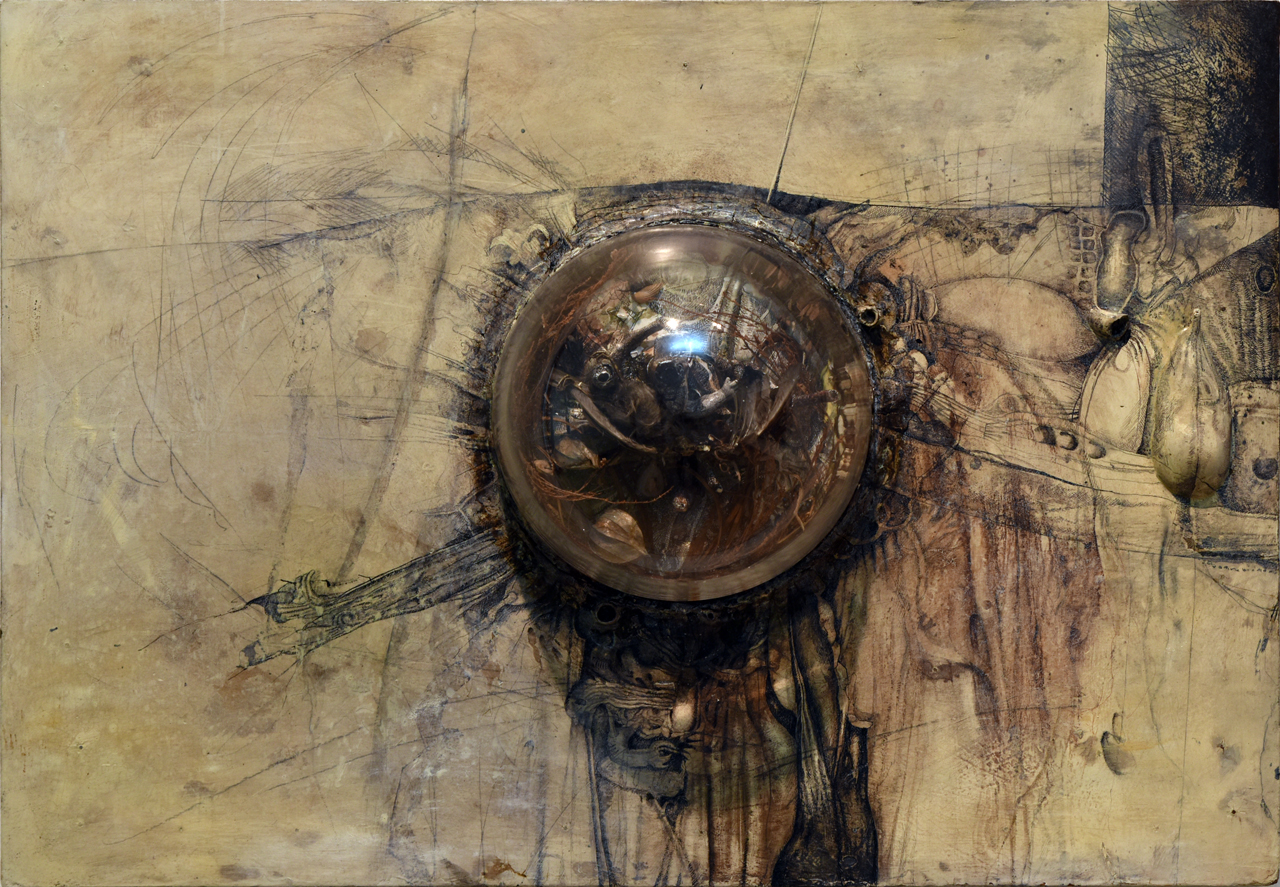
Study No. III (1964)

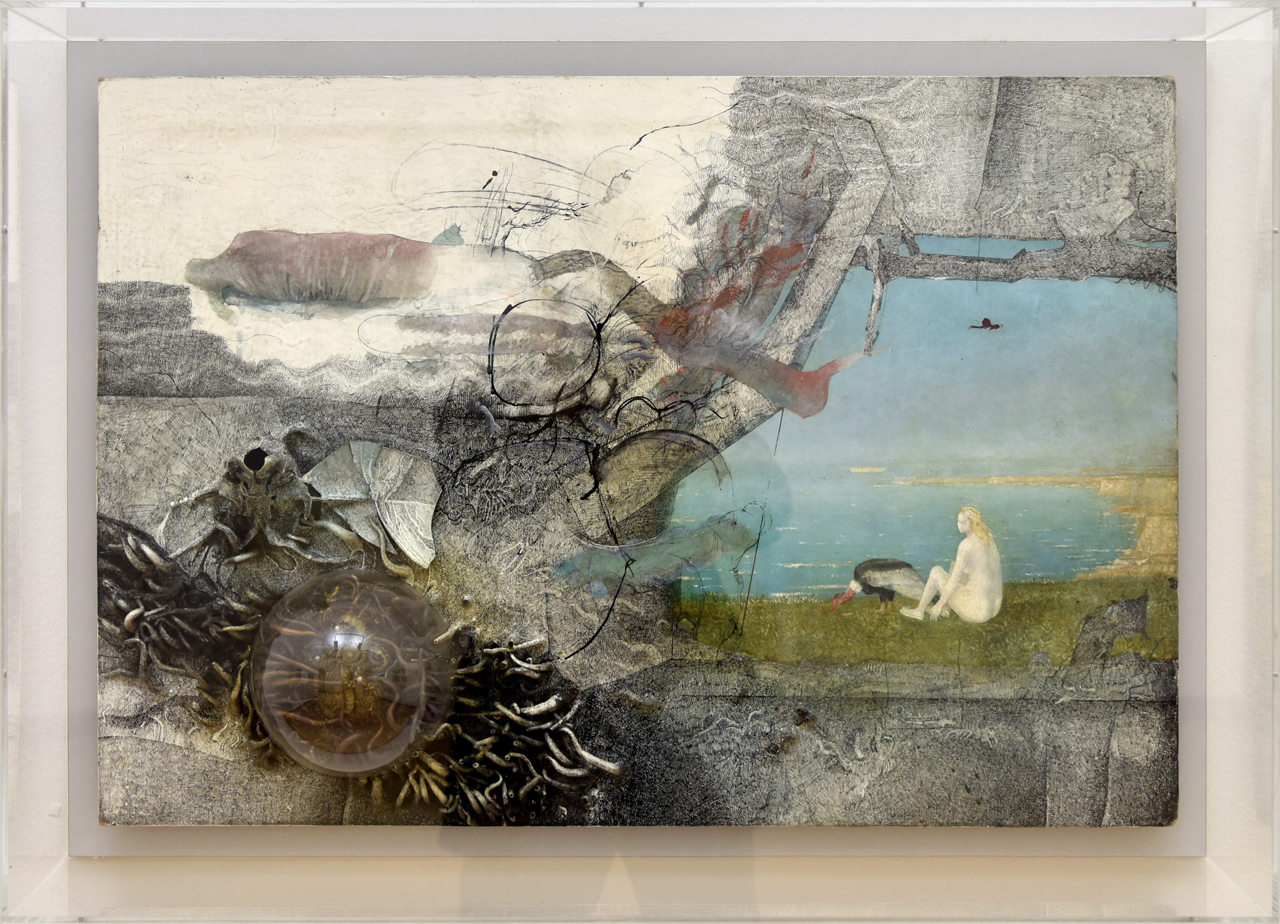
Study No. 66 – Moroa with Condor (1966), Gallery of Fine Arts in Ostrava

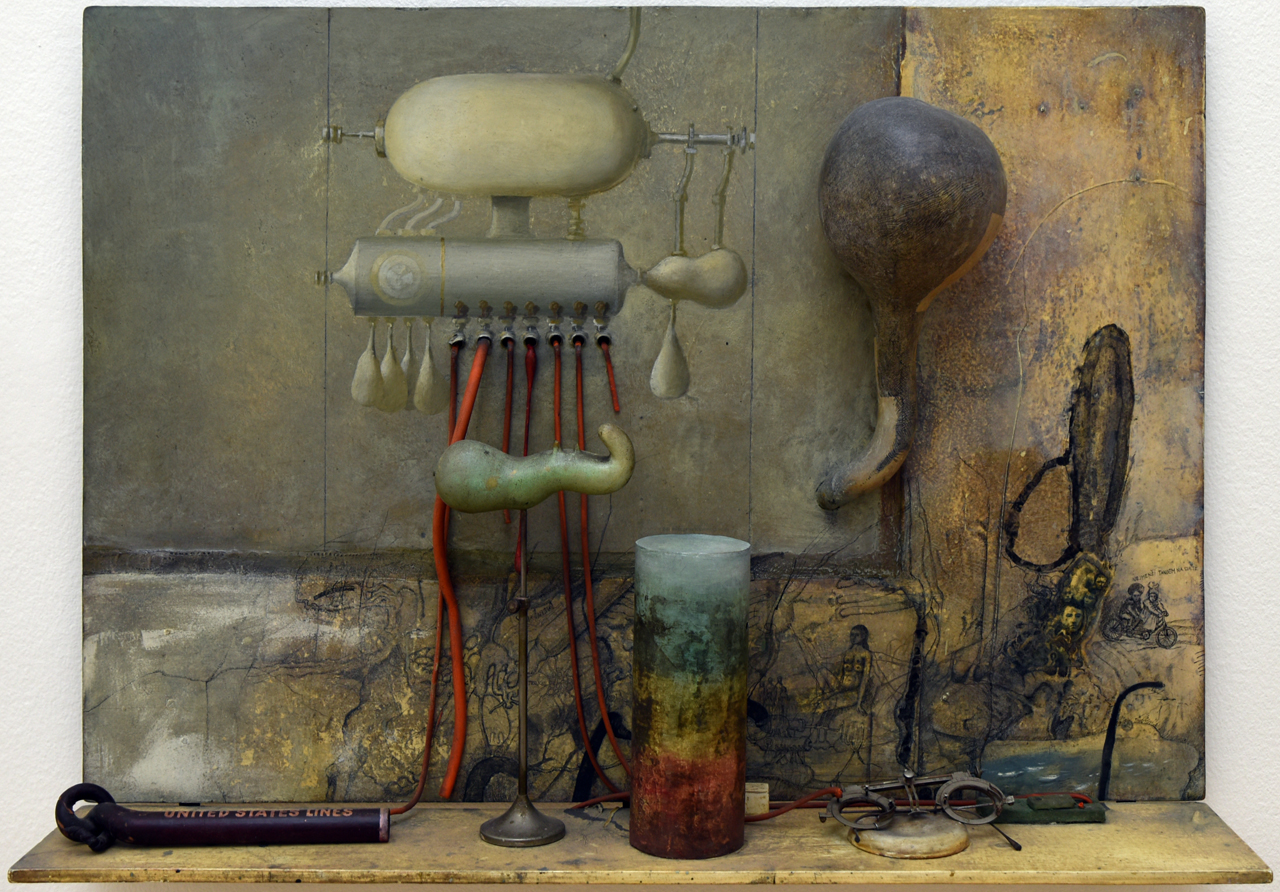
Machine for Making Things Worse (1967)

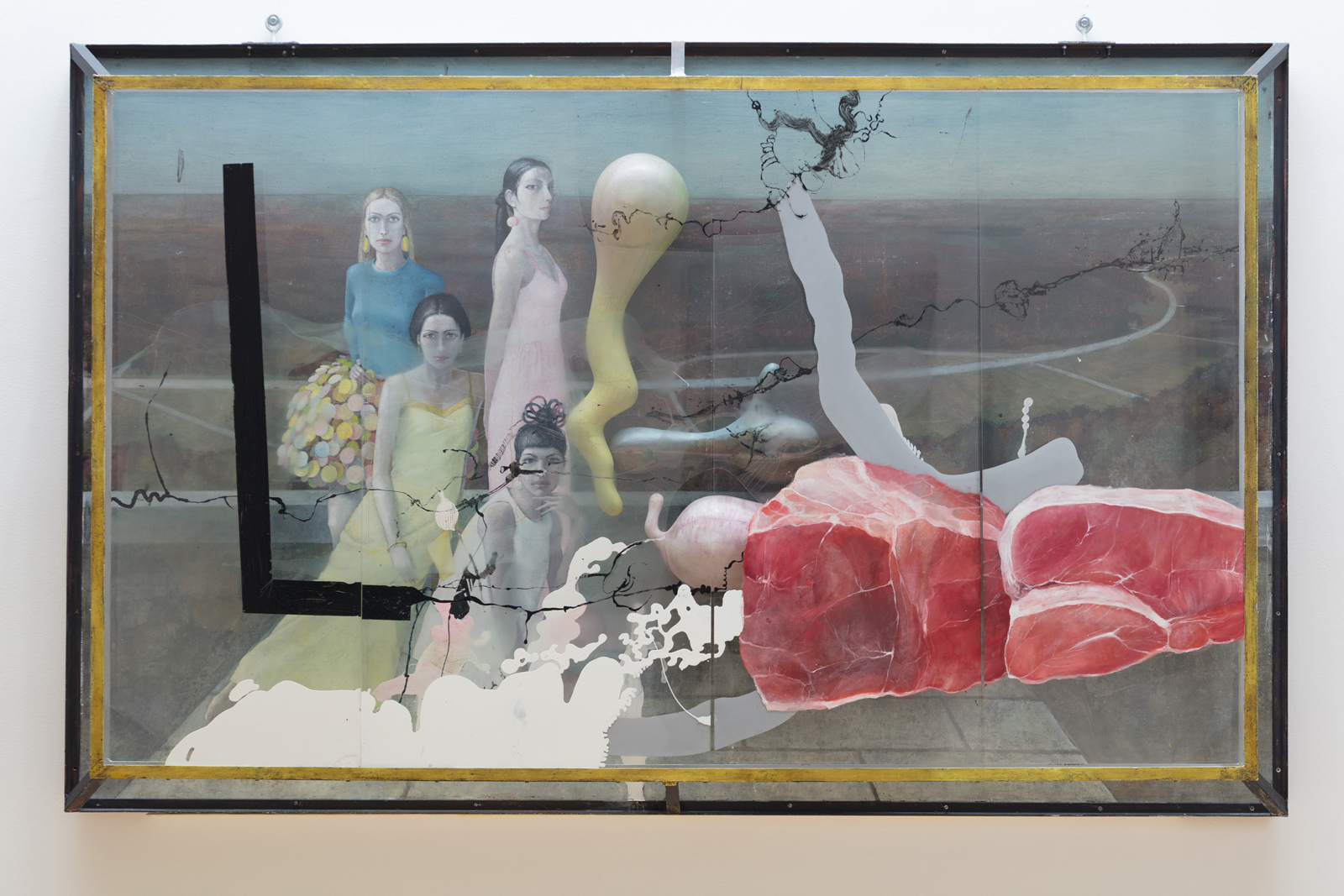
Object 68 A (1968), National Gallery in Prague

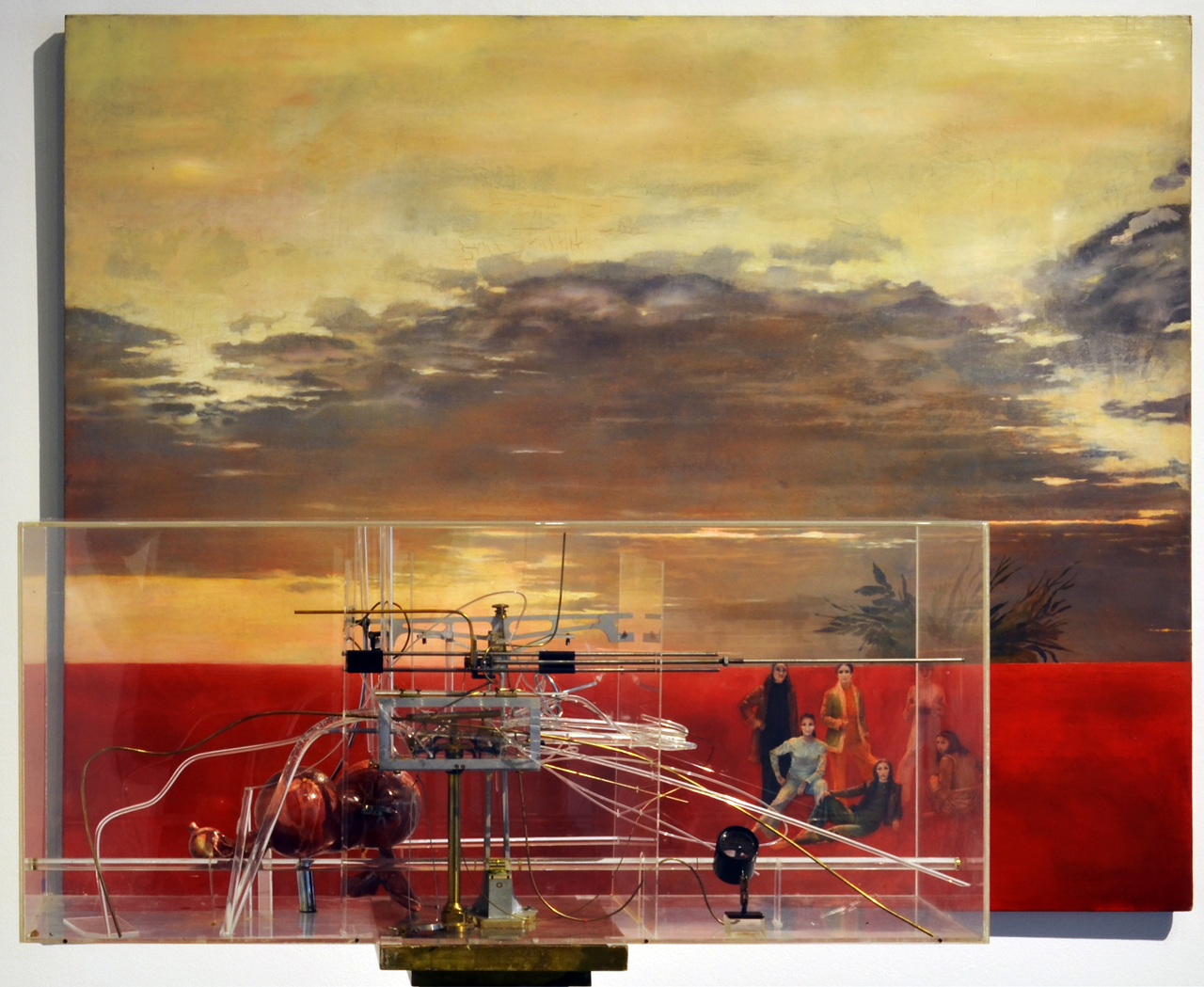
Landscape (1971), Gallery of Modern Art in Roudnice nad Labem

In the 1970s Dlouhý also created a “portrait gallery of banality” that borrowed from the iconography of fashion magazines. He elevated everyday items to art objects, combining them in his assemblages with illusionistic oil paintings on canvas that recalled the old masters. In the late 1970s he produced large-format drawings of everyday objects, attaching lightbulbs to illuminate the drawings from behind.

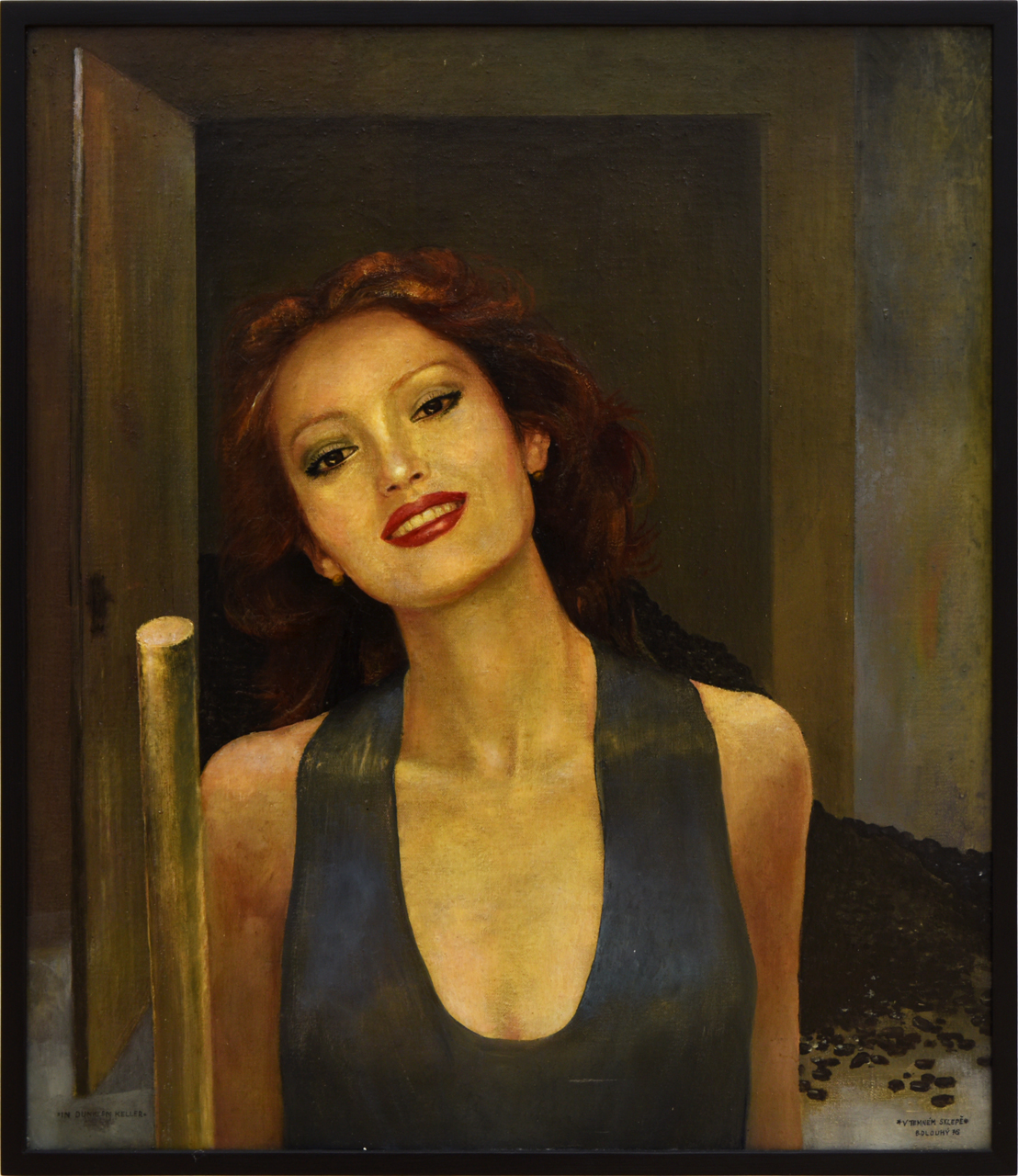
In a Dark Cellar (1976)

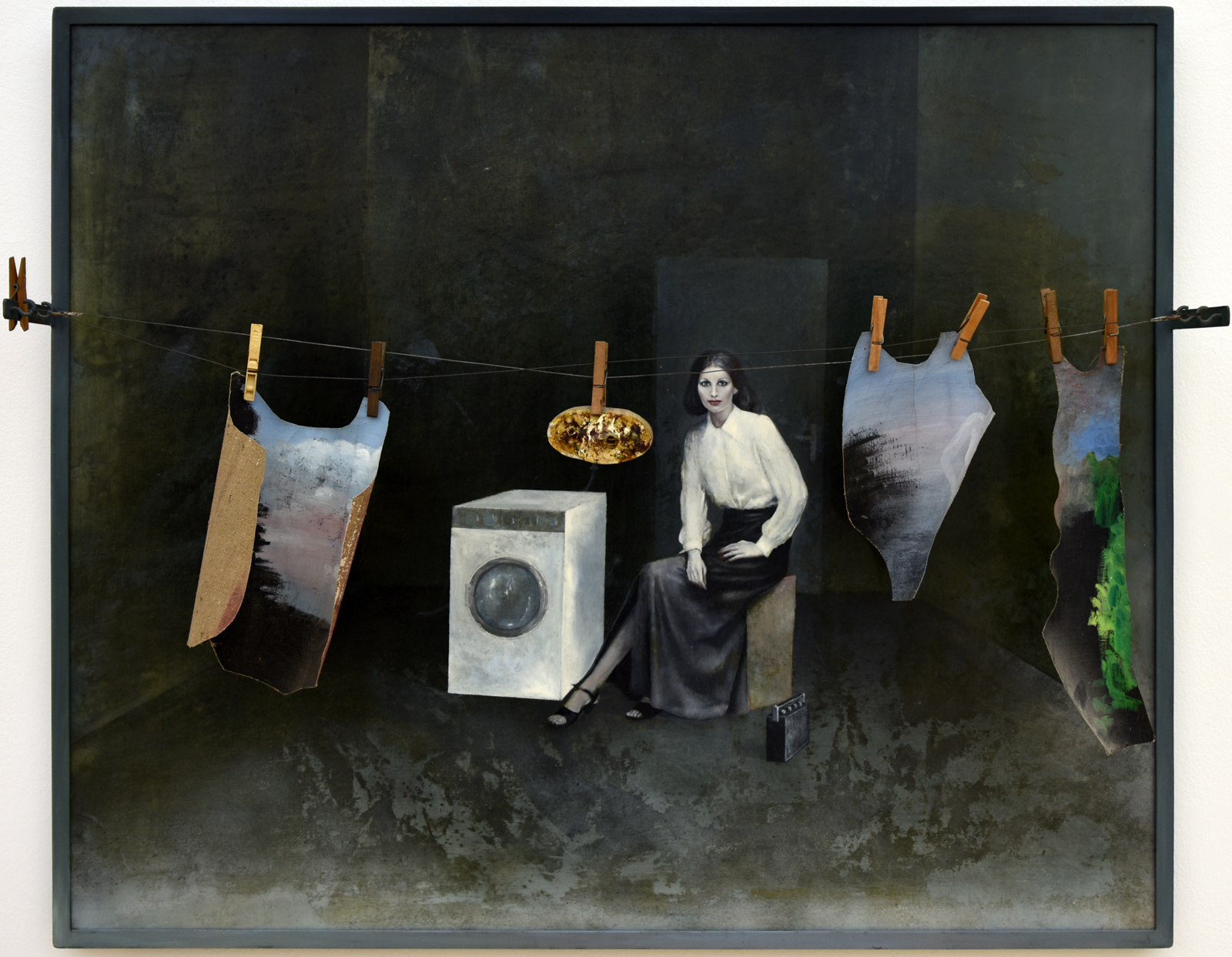
In the Laundry (1976)

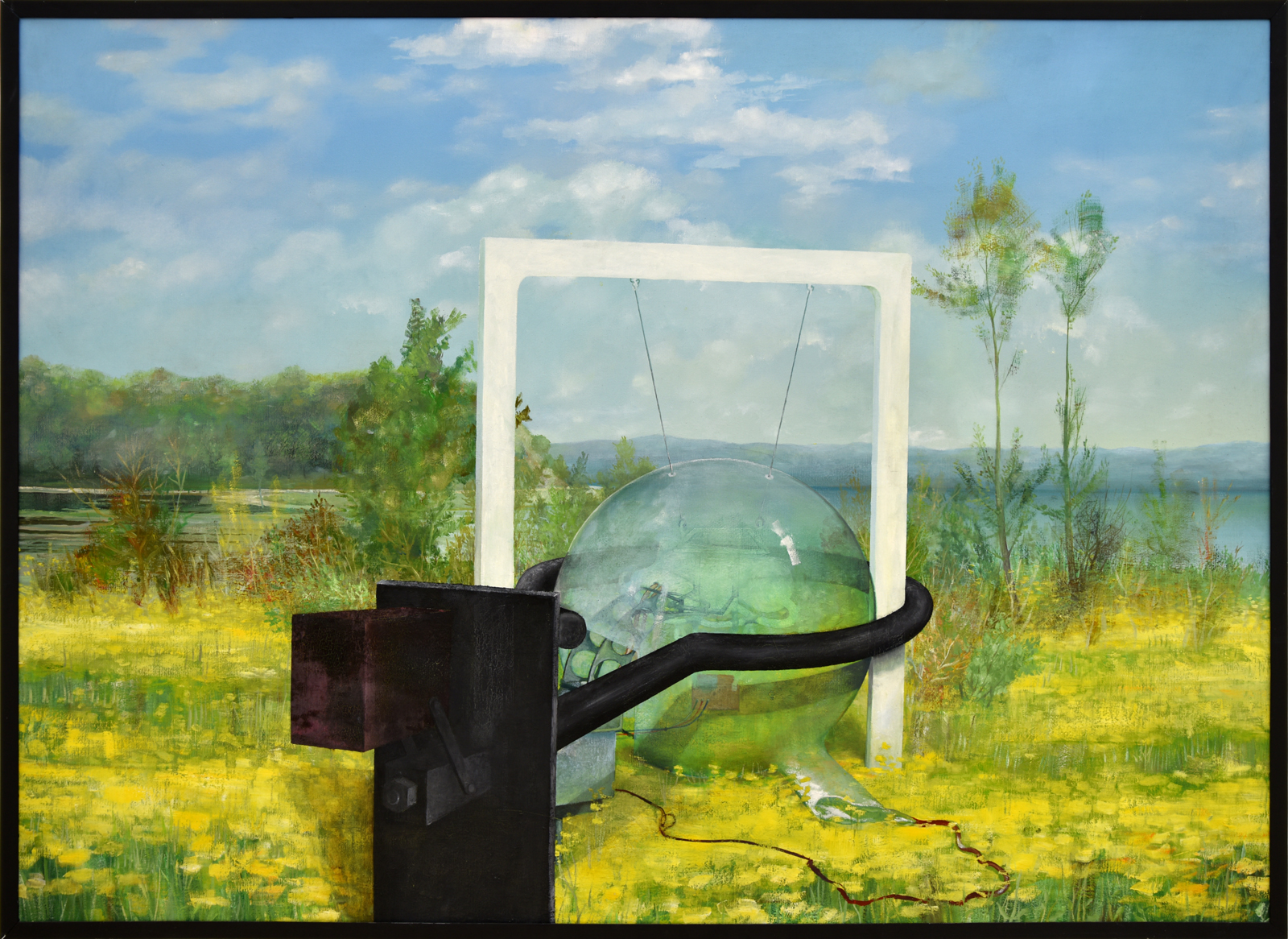
Test (1978)

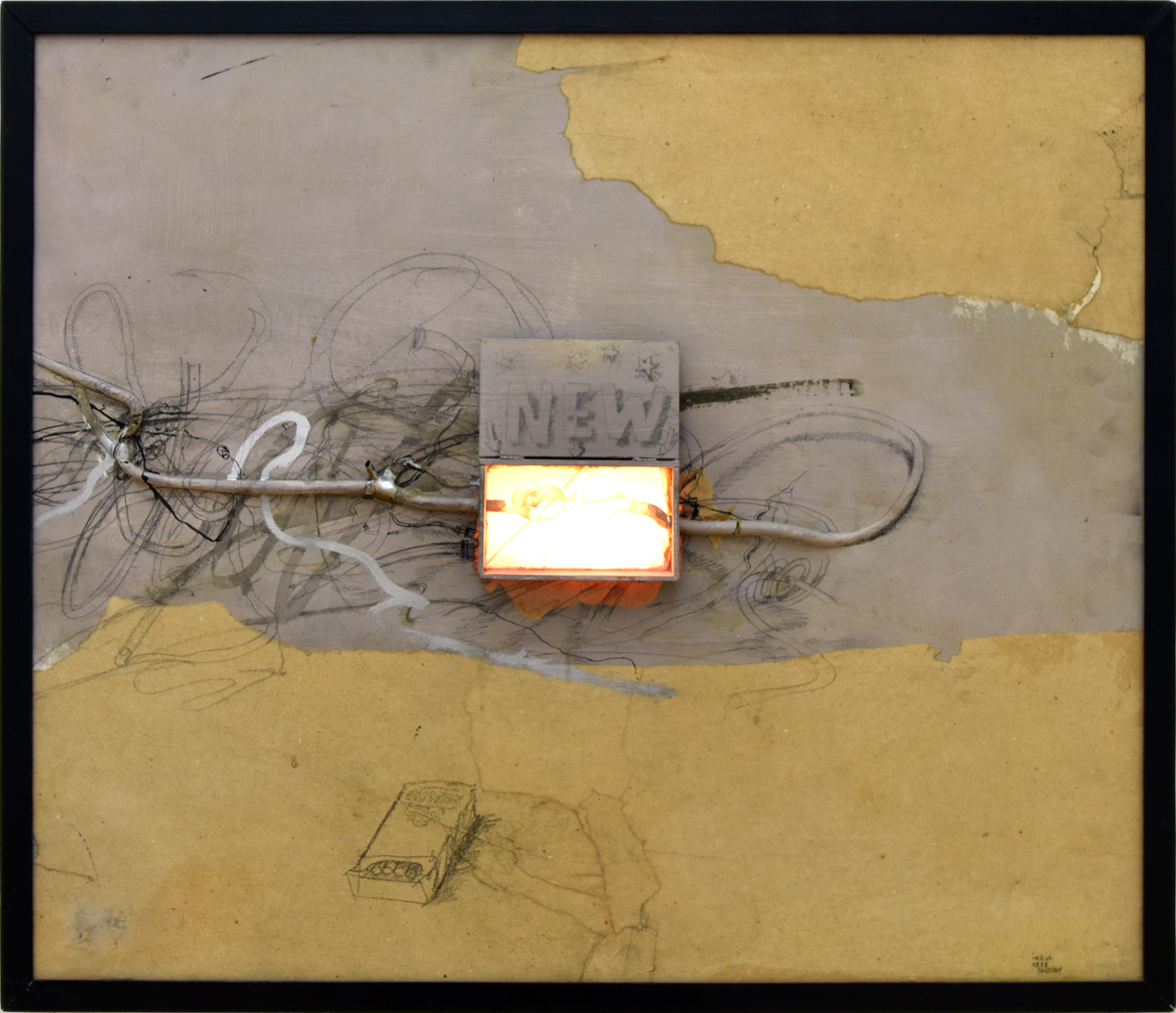
New (1978)

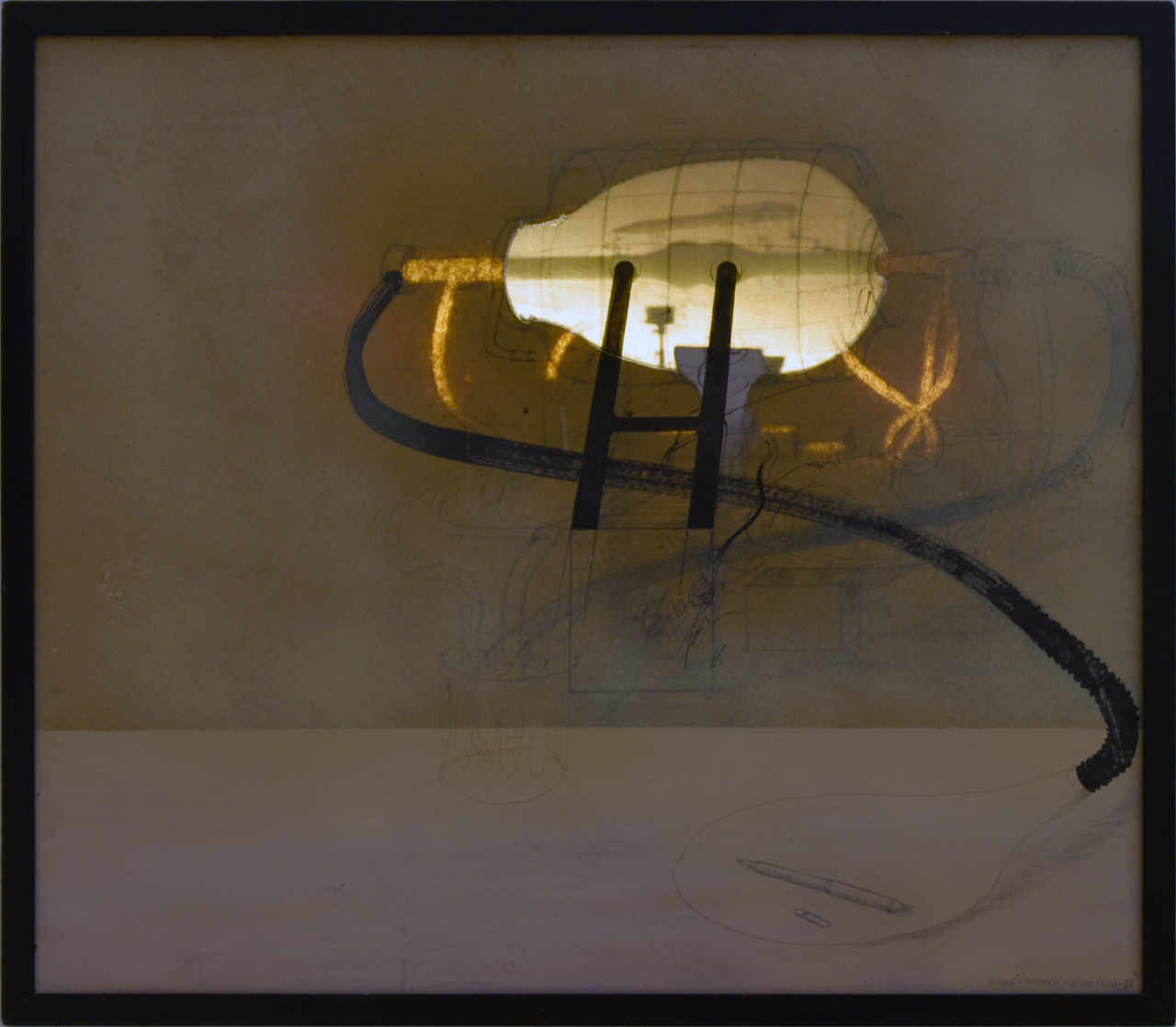
Testing the Fountain Pen – Etude (1979)

The subjects of Dlouhý's illusionistic paintings from the latter half of the 1980s were often walls and enlarged details of the human body (Wall and Body, 1990), or quotations of old masters (Rembrandt, Vermeer) that he semantically transposed almost to the point of flippancy (The Lacemaker, 1986). In Bedřich Dlouhý's art the symbiosis of real objects (which Dlouhý used for their formal qualities) and perfectly three-dimensional illusionistic painting has no rules or limitations, and it points to the legacy of surrealism (Strange Thing, 1991; Symbiosis of Futility, 1997). His working process was “to think through matter”, which can be understood as a drama of pure form that comes together to create certain compositions before collapsing back into fragments and components. Together, form and content represent an absolute unity.

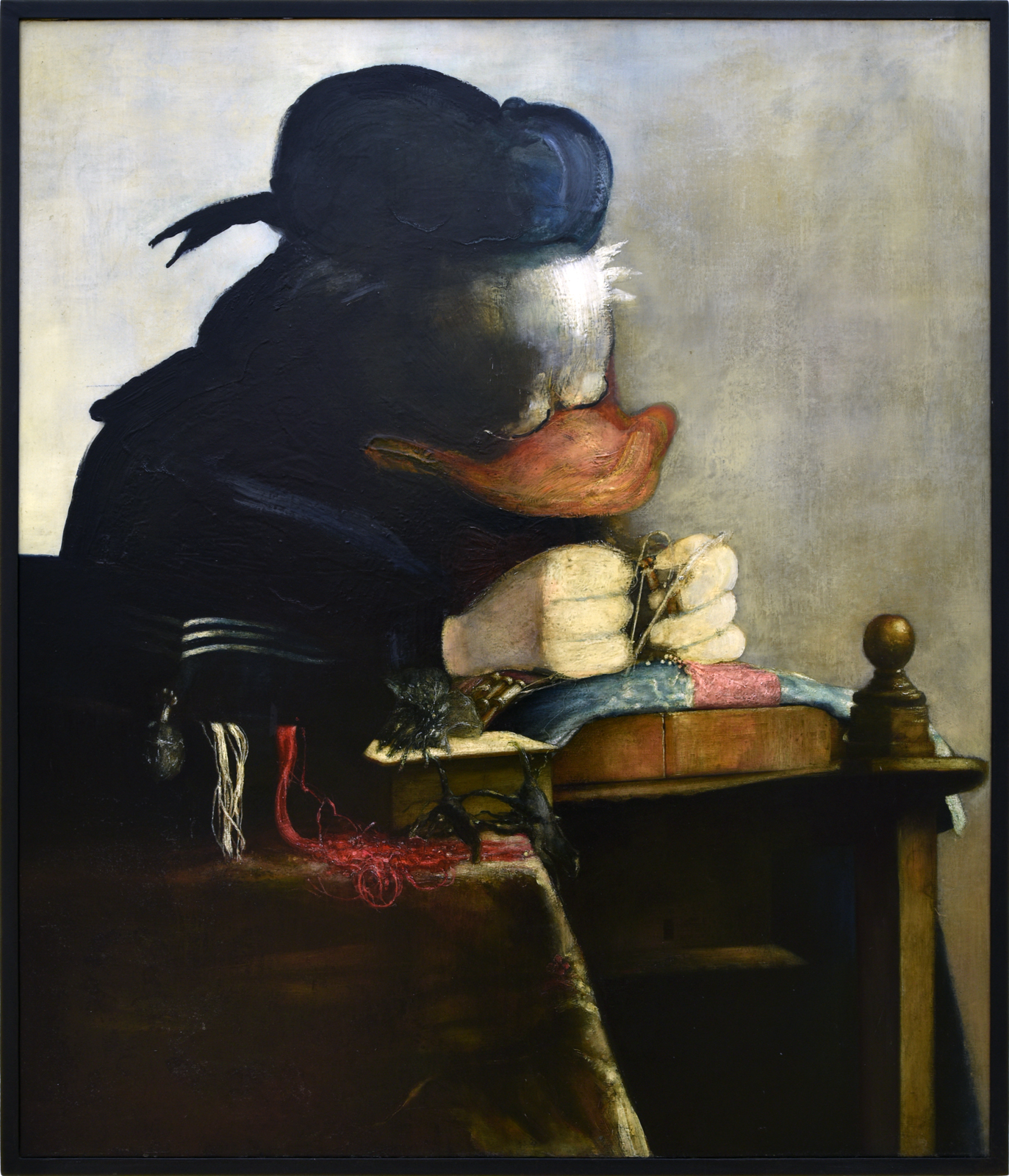
The Lacemaker (1986), Museum Kampa

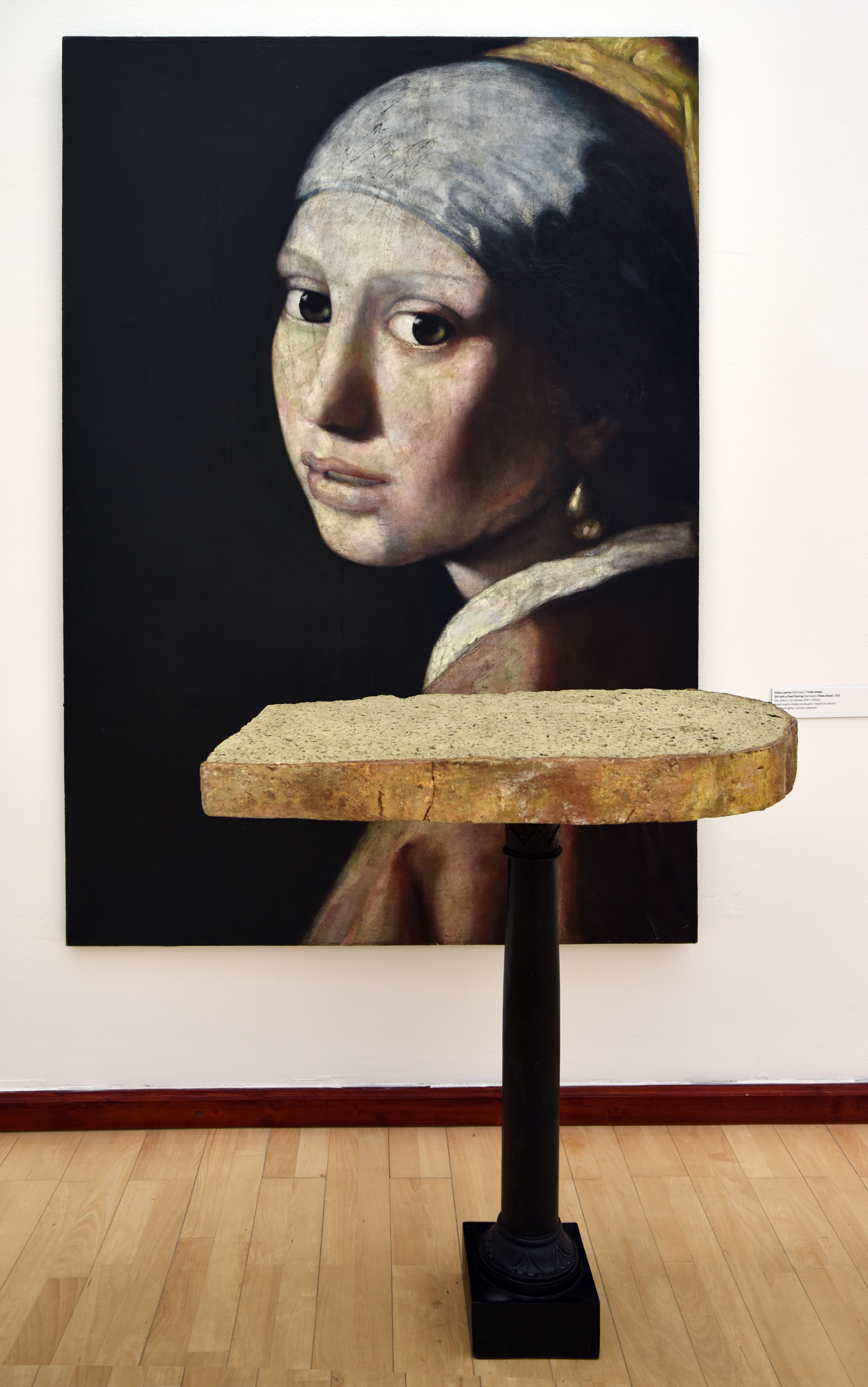
Girl with a Pearl Earring, Hard Bread (1988)

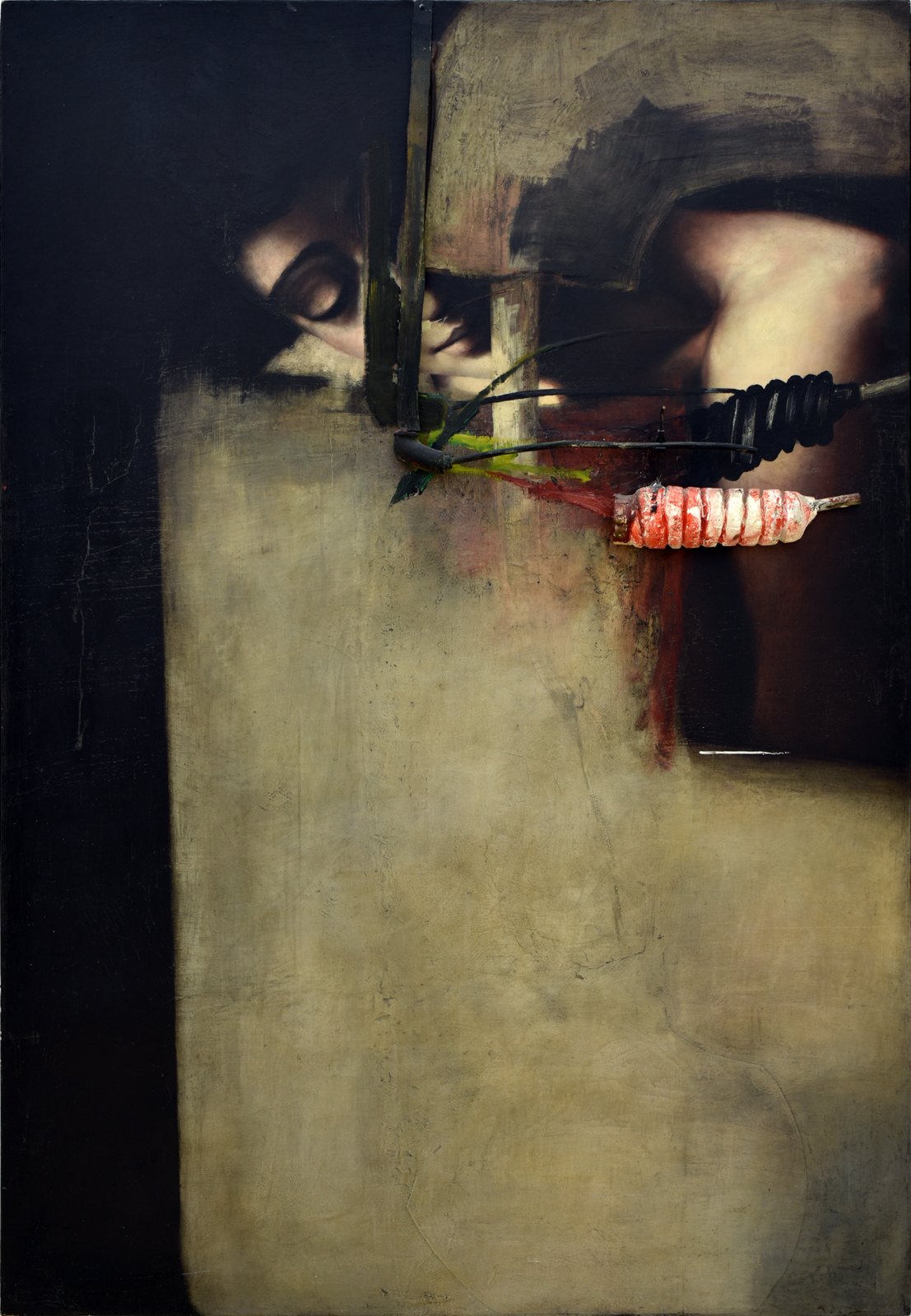
Testing the Baroque - Caravaggio (1988)

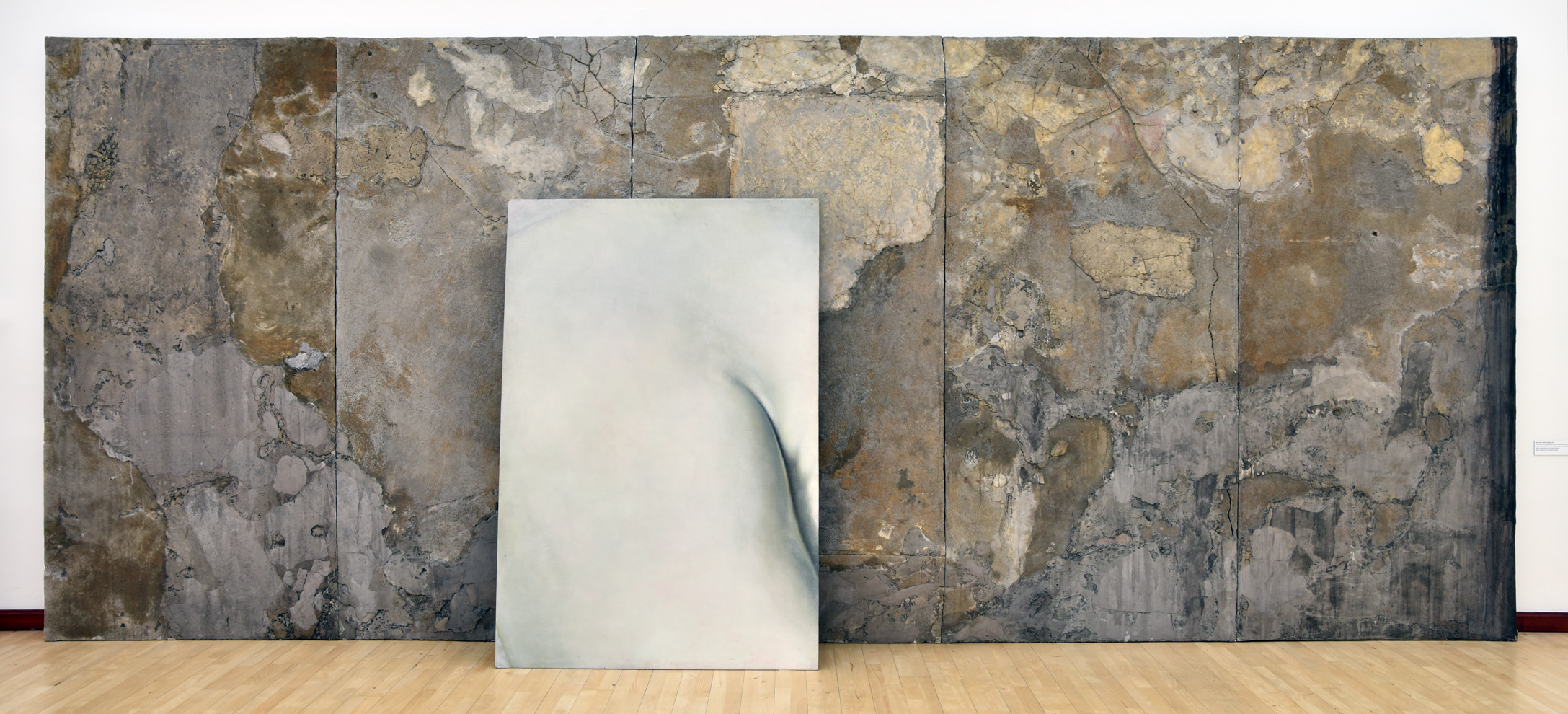
Wall and Body (1990), Gallery of Modern Art, Hradec Králové

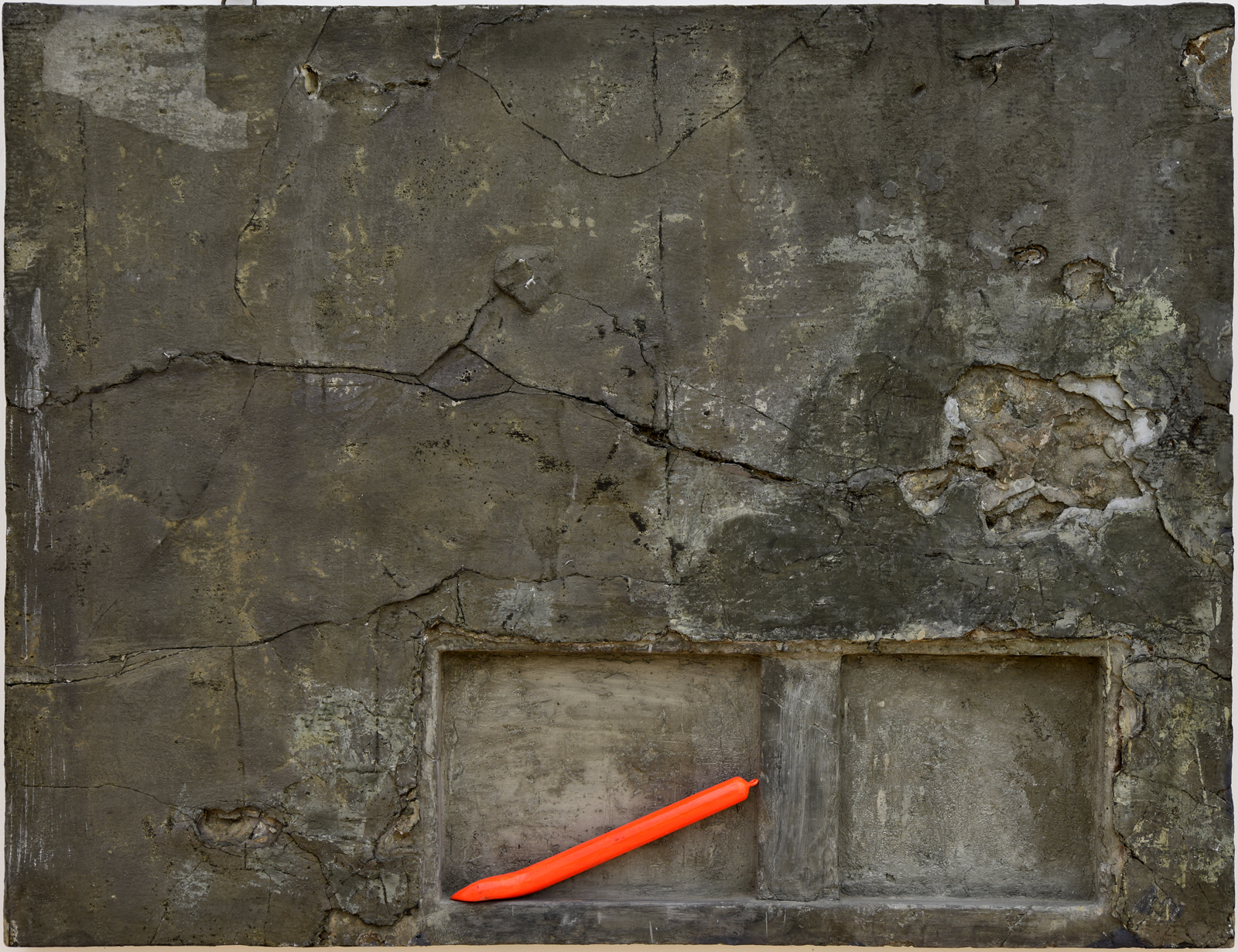
Strange Thing (1991), COLLETT Prague-Munich

In the late 1990s, Dlouhý's masterful painting played with the illusion of reality in a series about evaluating (Evaluating Plasticity; Evaluating the Genuineness of Drawing; Evaluating the Vitality of Drawing, 1997) and evaluators (Normality Evaluator, 1997). He also entirely upended the significance of the artist's self-portrait, which for him was more an impressive summary of his mastery of various techniques (Self-Portrait II, 2002). One can also see a picture of his worktable as a kind of self-portrait that reveals the quotidian world of its creator. Dlouhý's oeuvre is strongly autobiographical, and in its entirety it forms an on-going self-portrait of the artist.

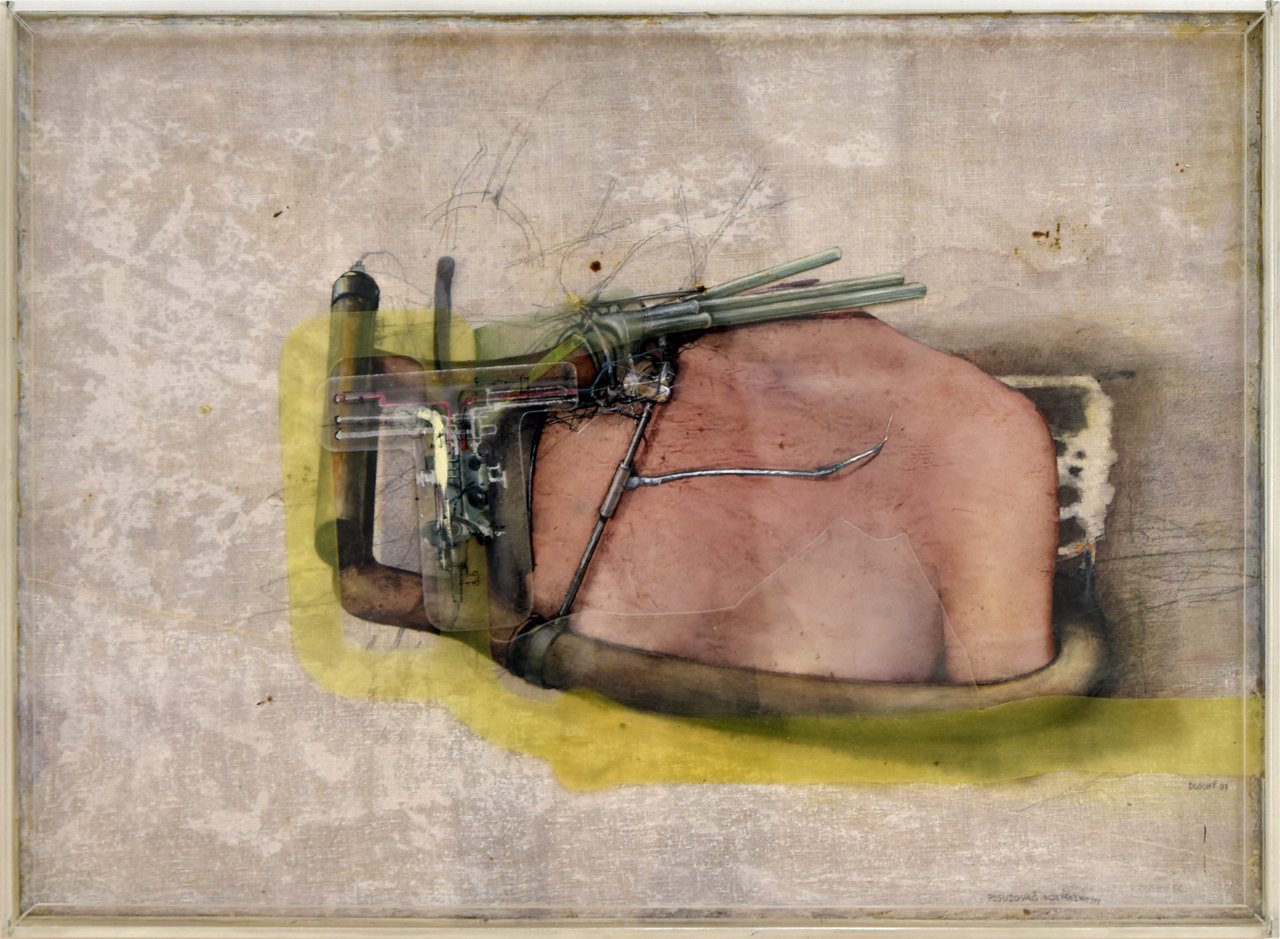
Normality Evaluator (1997)

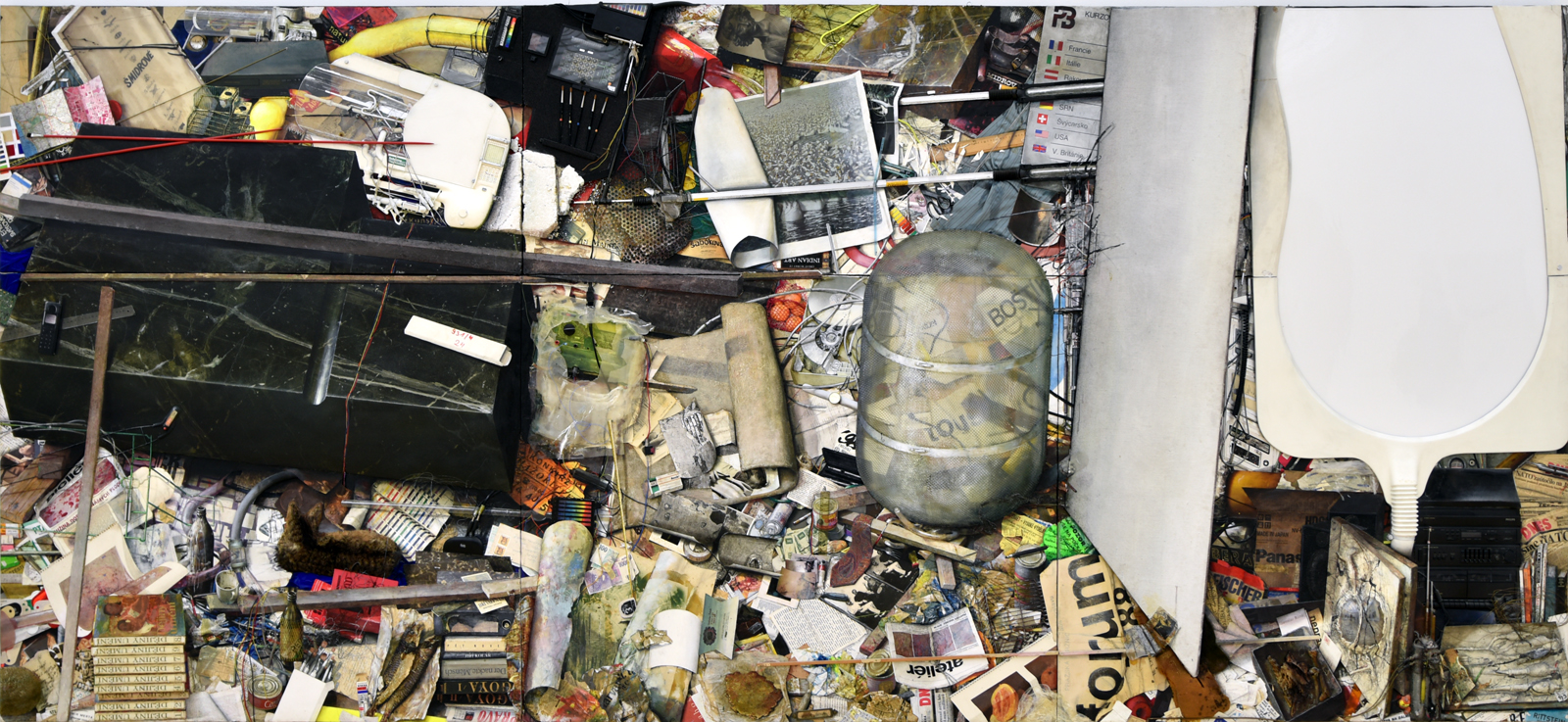
Bedřich Dlouhý, Self-portrait I (1993-1999)

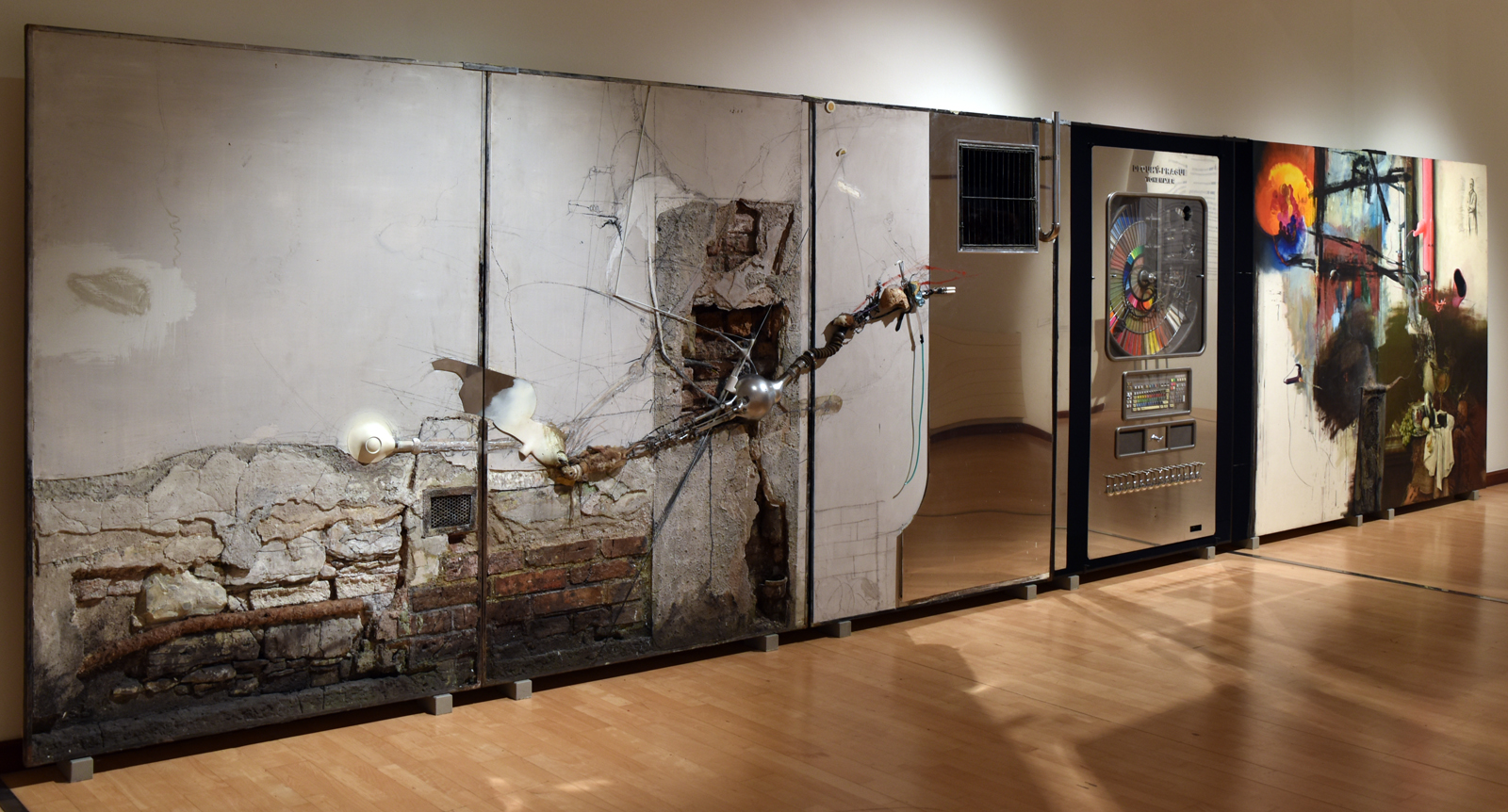
Bedřich Dlouhý, Self-portrait II (1999-2007)

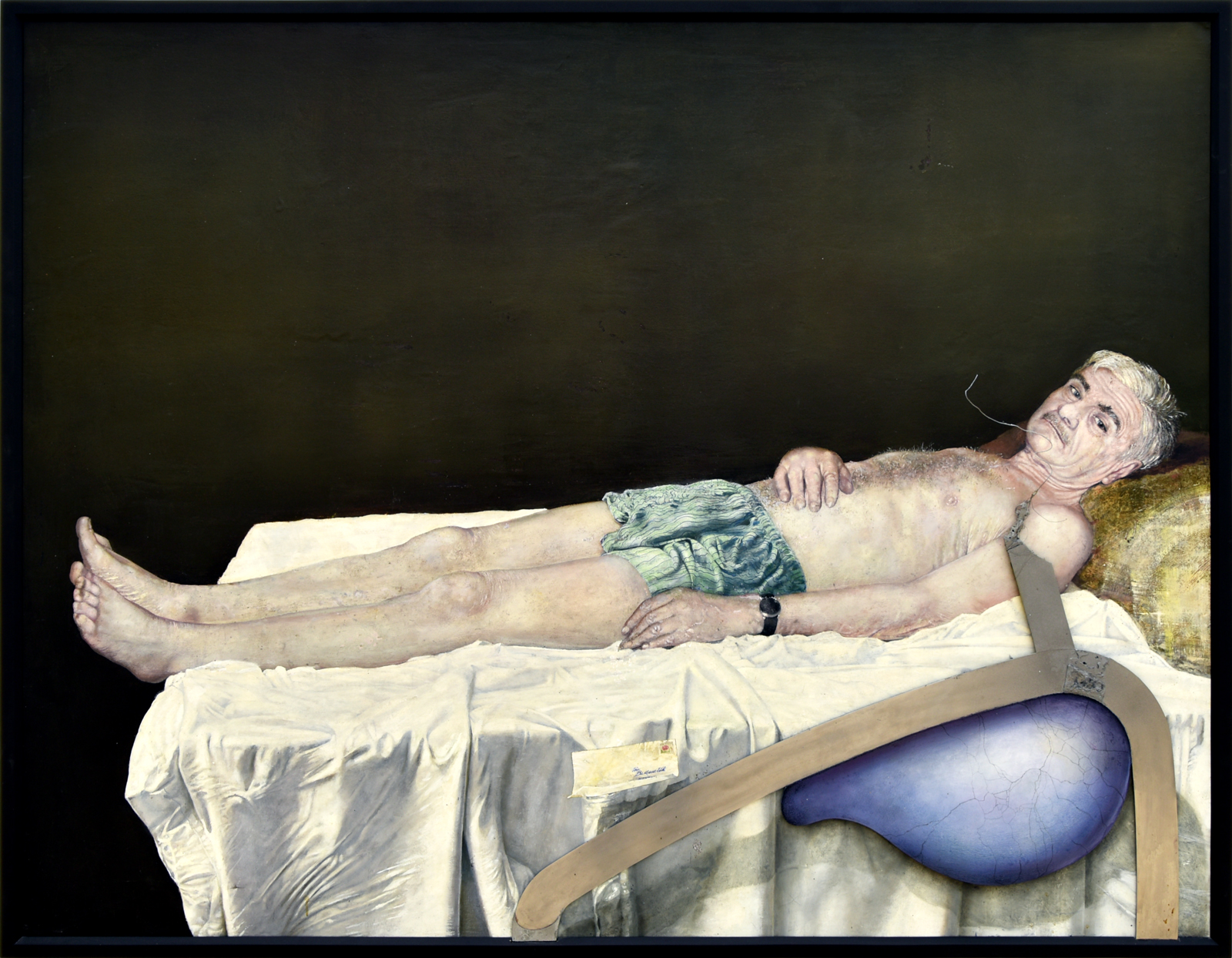
Bedřich Dlouhý, Self-portrait III (2008)

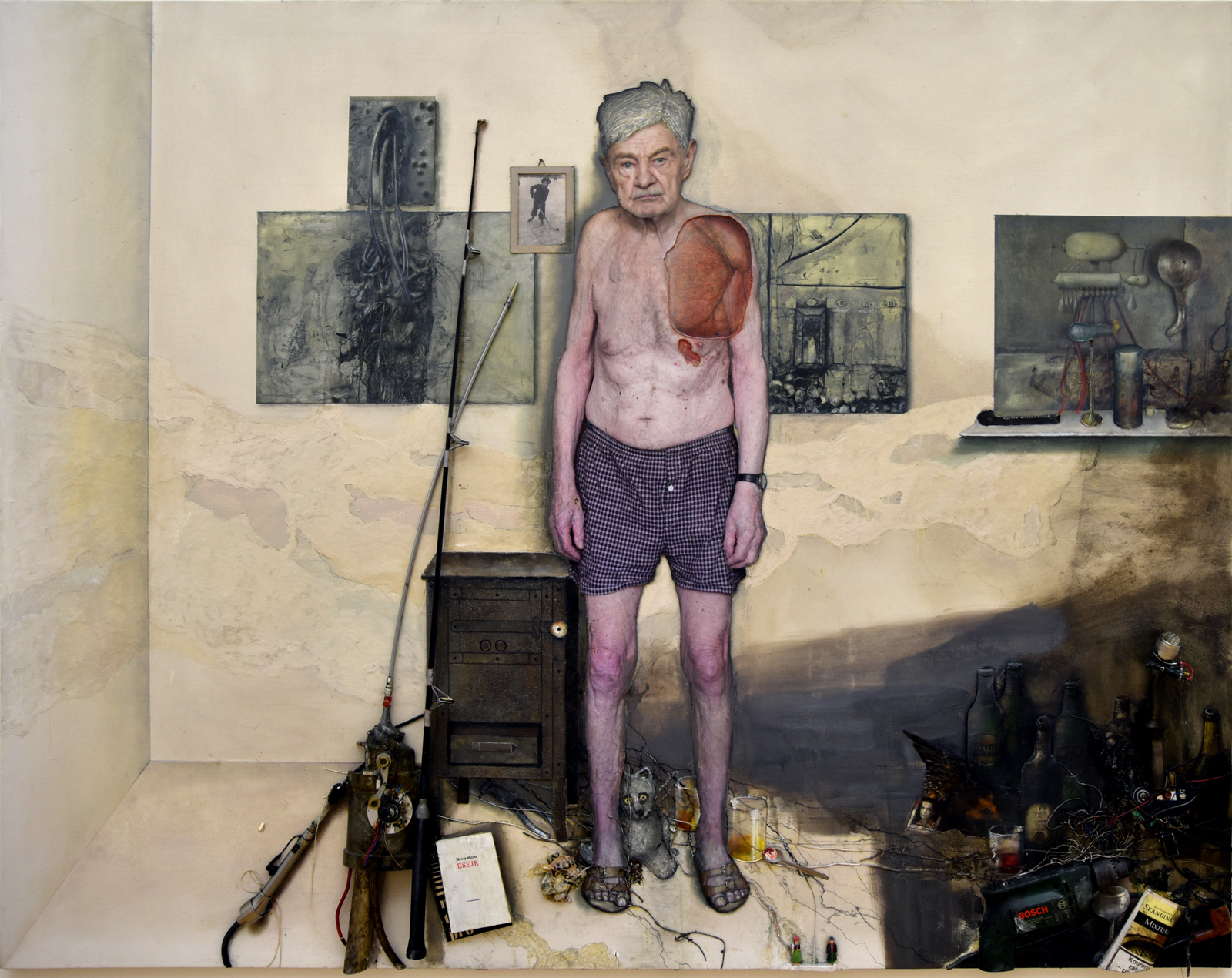
Academic Painter B.D. Thinks Back (2019)

Bedřich Dlouhý's paintings since 2000 are unique in modern Czech art. They include his monumental still life Foundation Test (2003-2004), which in its dimensions (140 × 180 cm) and precision can rival 17th-century Flemish still lifes. Subsequent paintings have spatial depth and a refined play of light (Thing II, 2004; the Inversion series, 2007) or complicated surface structures, created purely by painting, that give a perfect illusion of three-dimensional sculpture (Mythology, 2009).

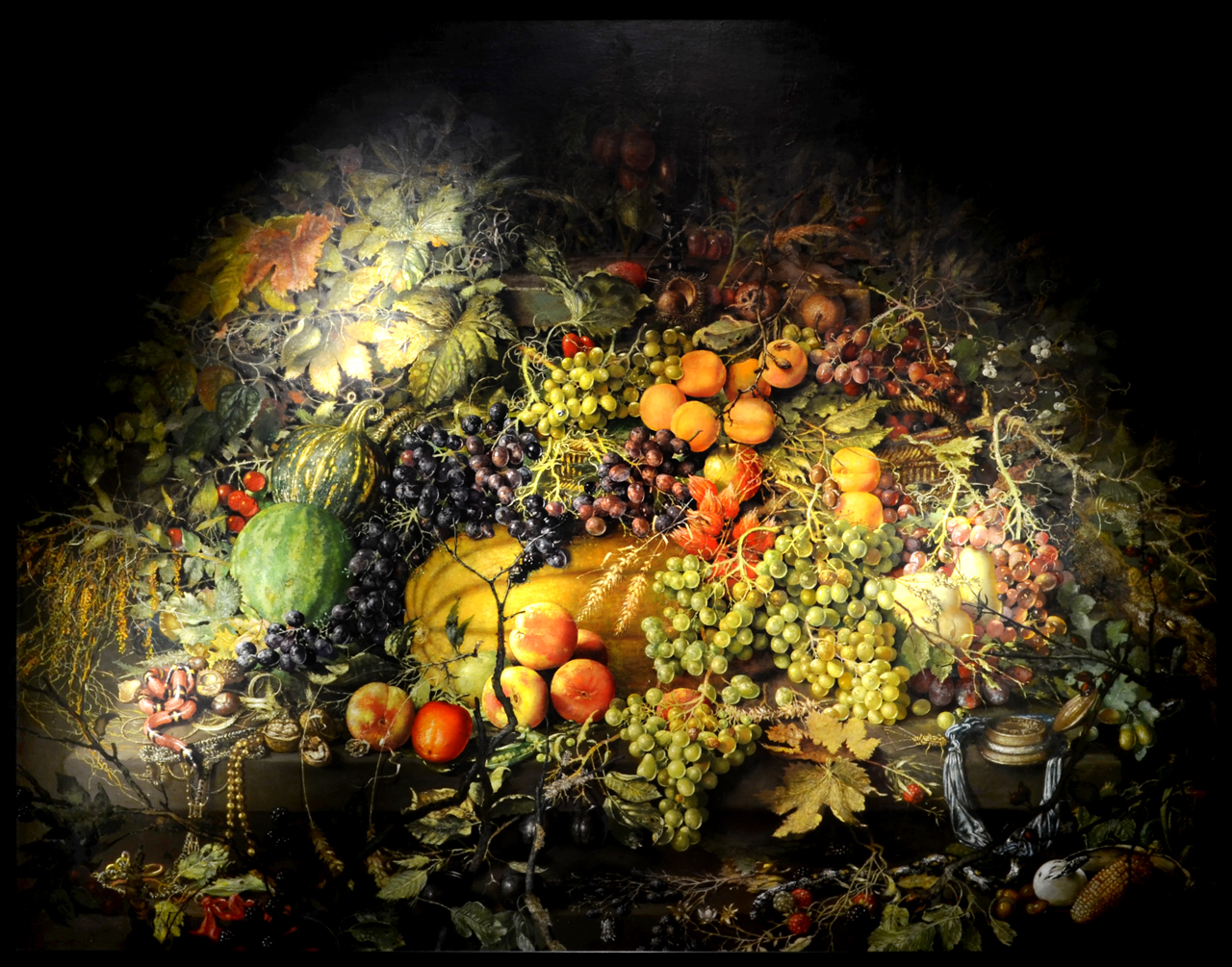
Foundation Test (2003–2004), Museum Montanelli

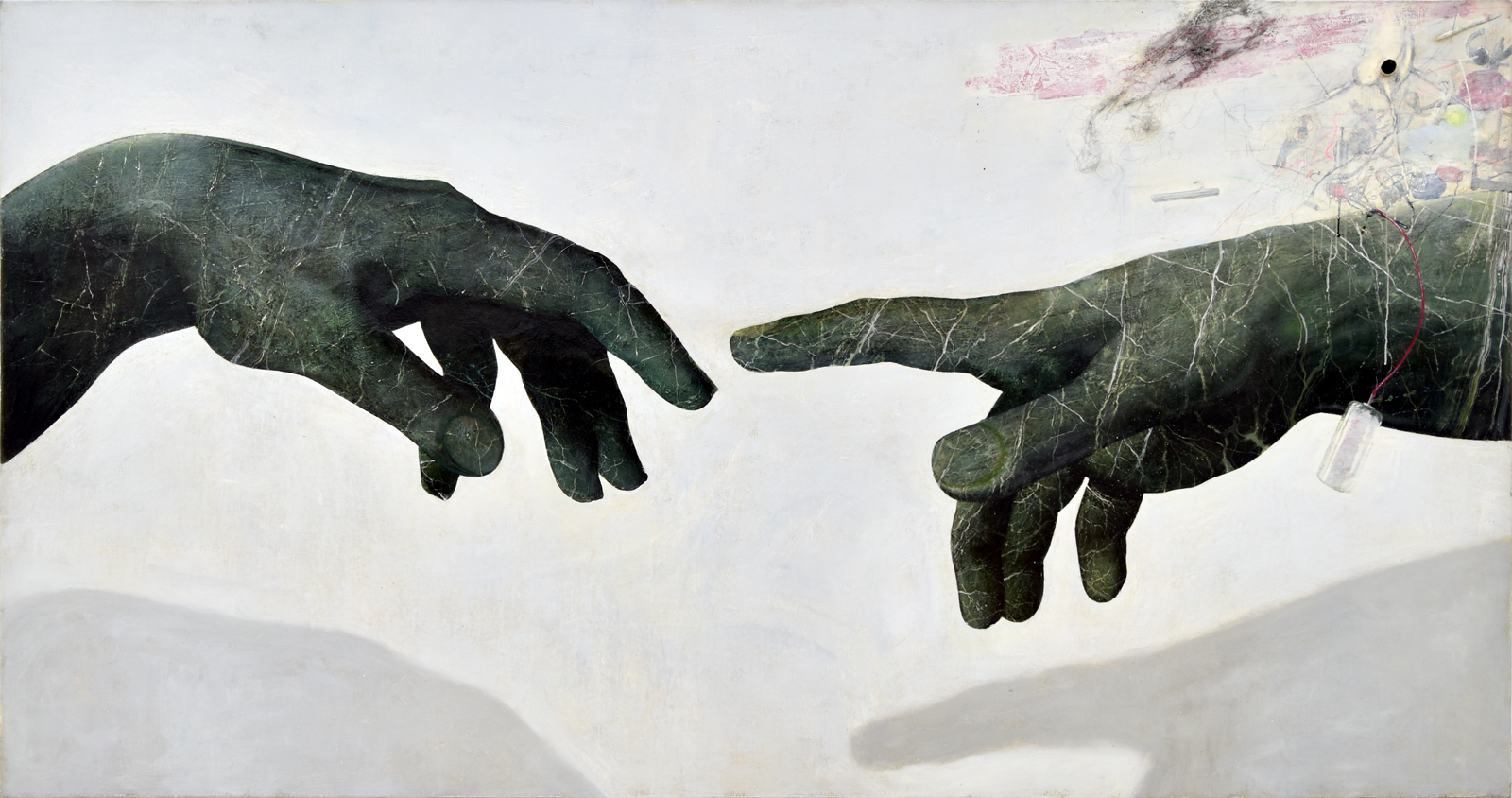
Revival (2007)

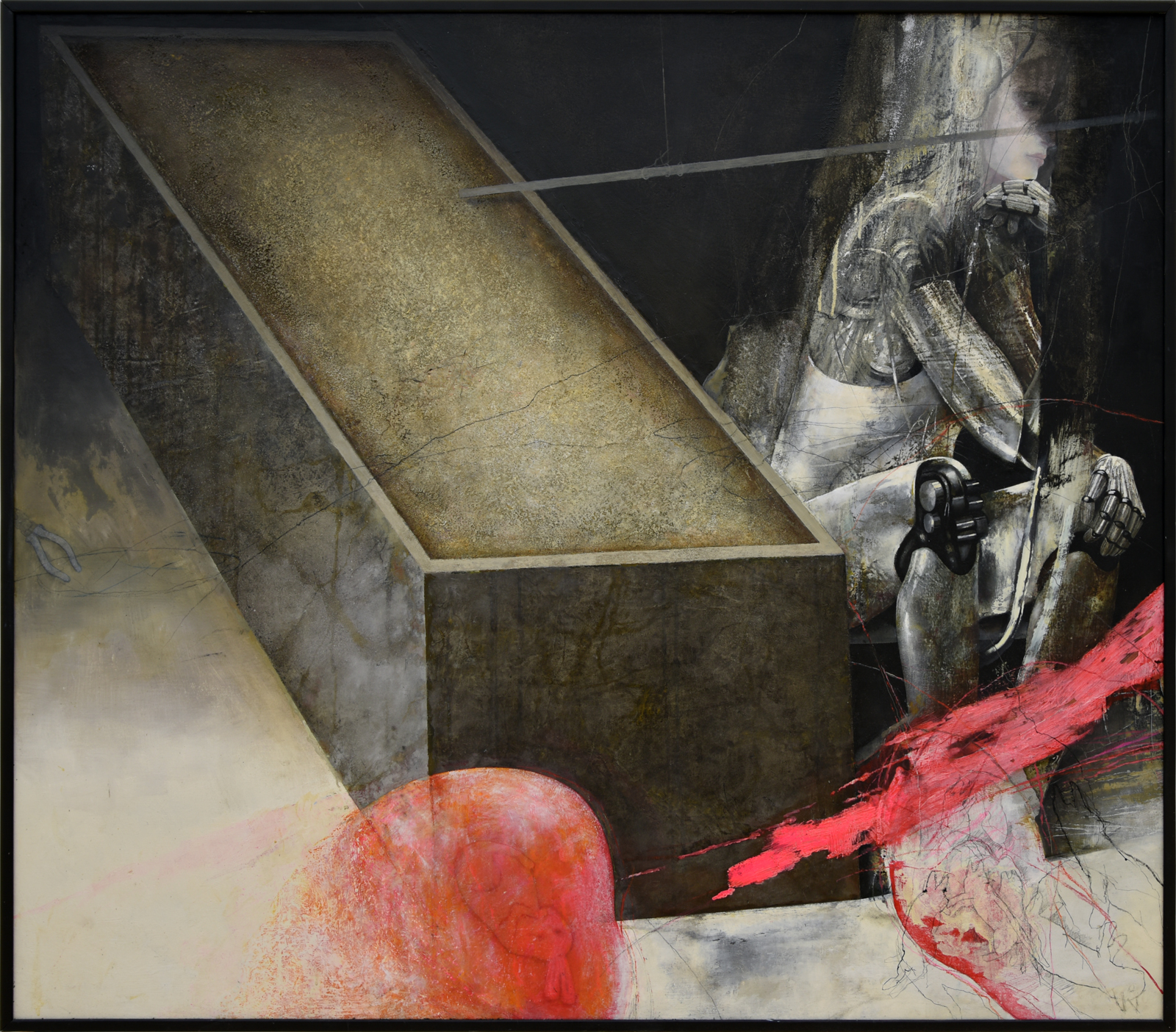
Robotic Woman (2008)

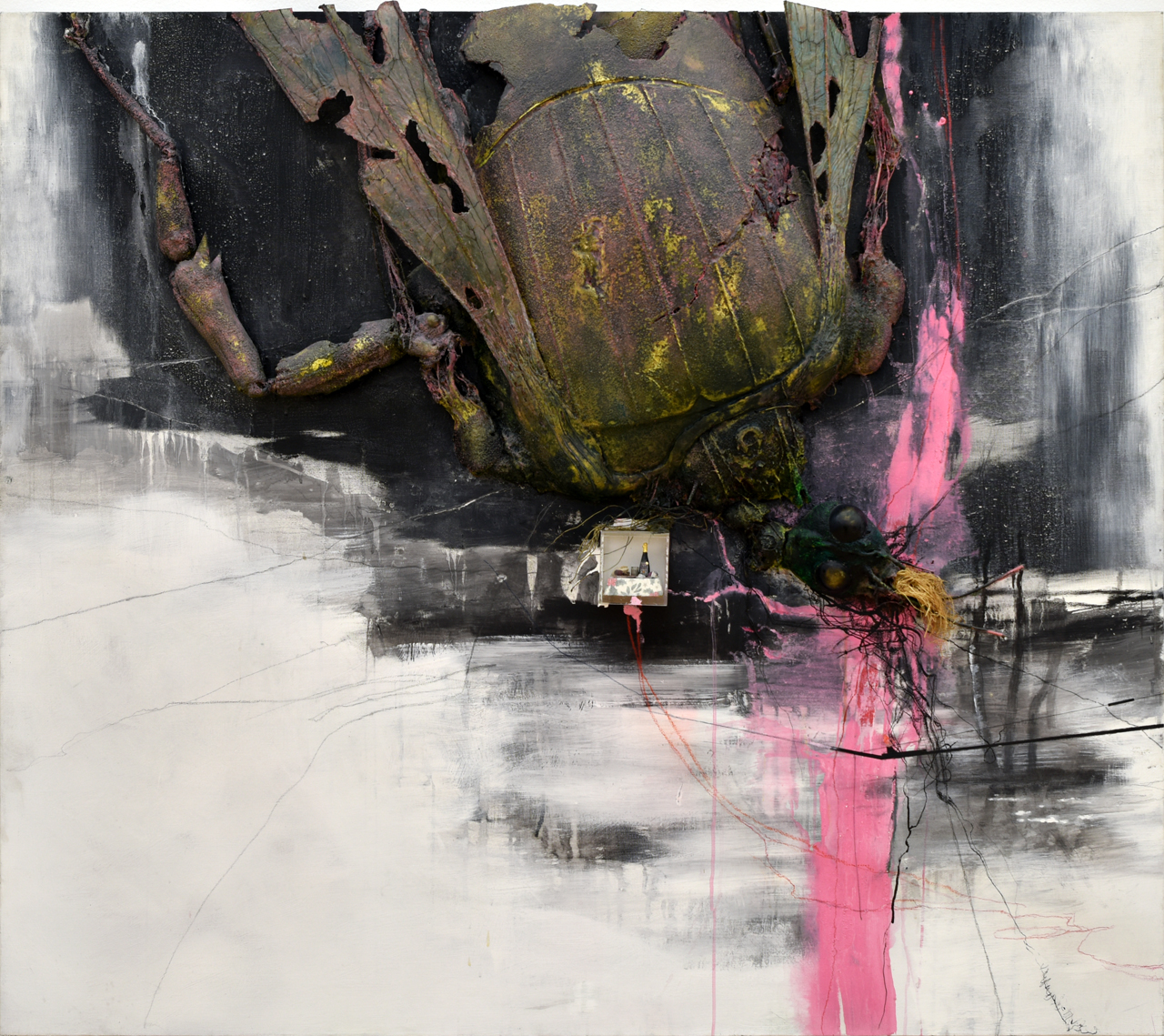
The Last Supper (2011)

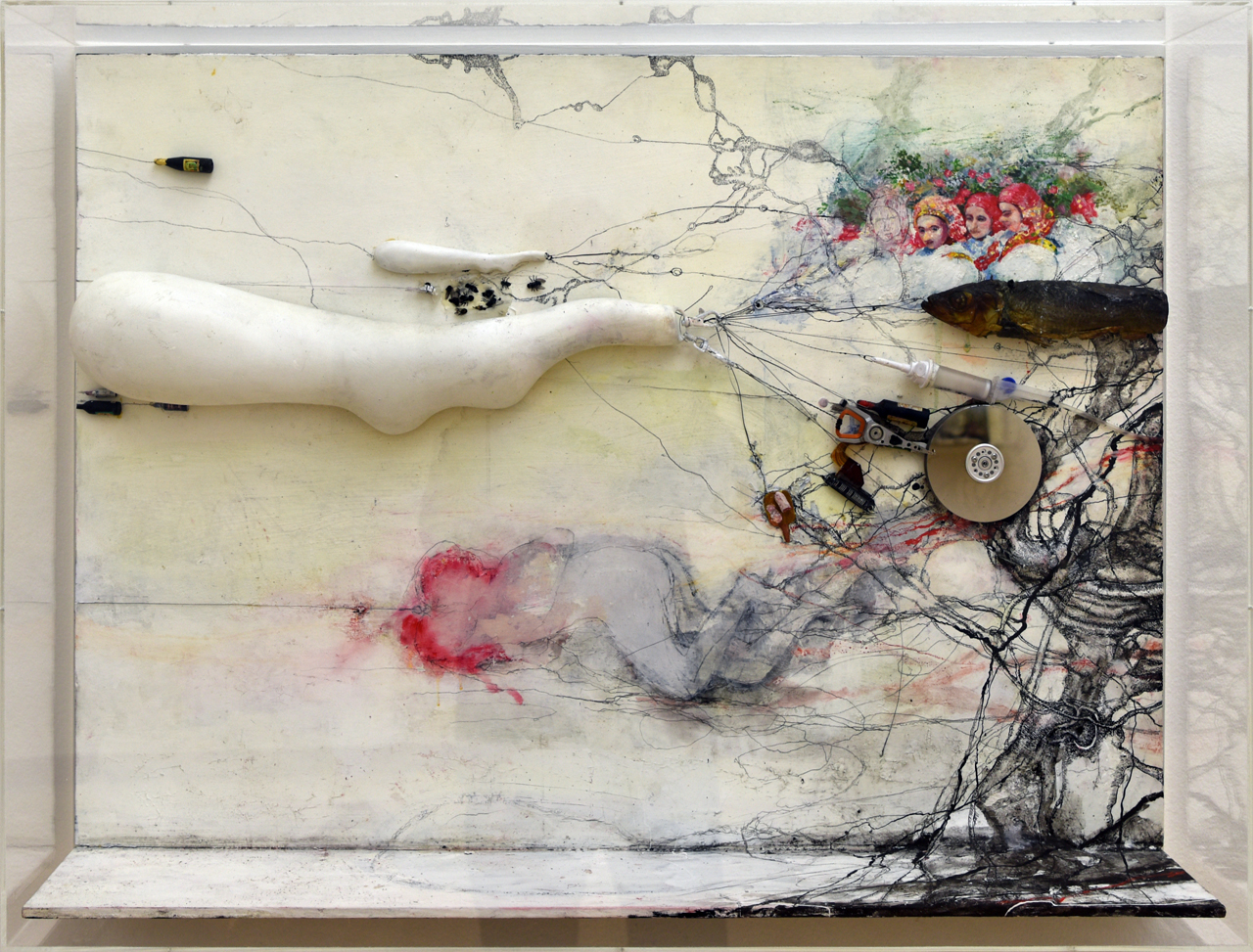
Calling (2014)

=== Objects ===
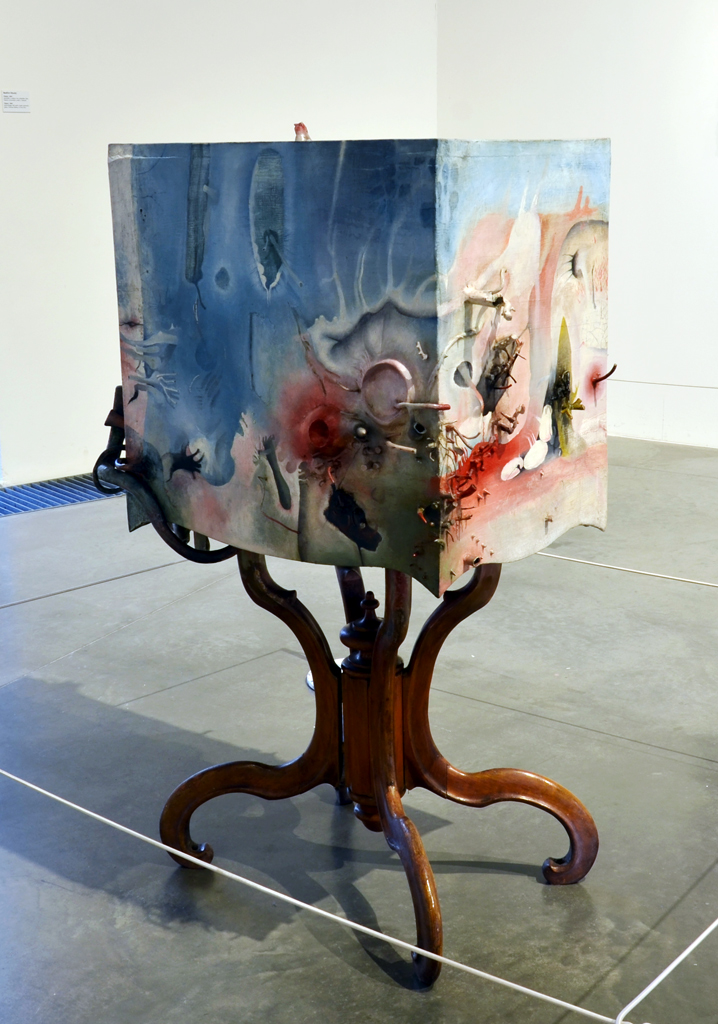
Object (1963), Gallery of Fine Arts in Ostrava

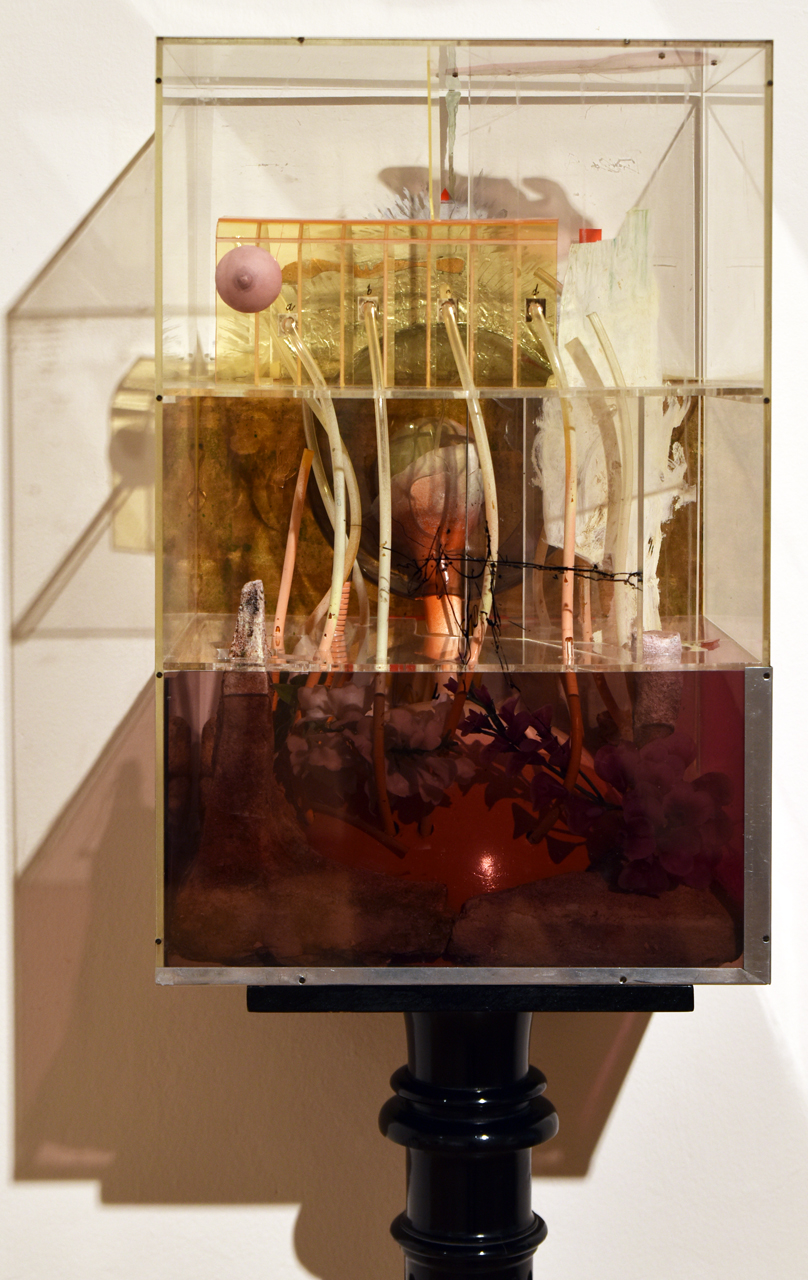
Design for a monument of Rembrandt (1969)

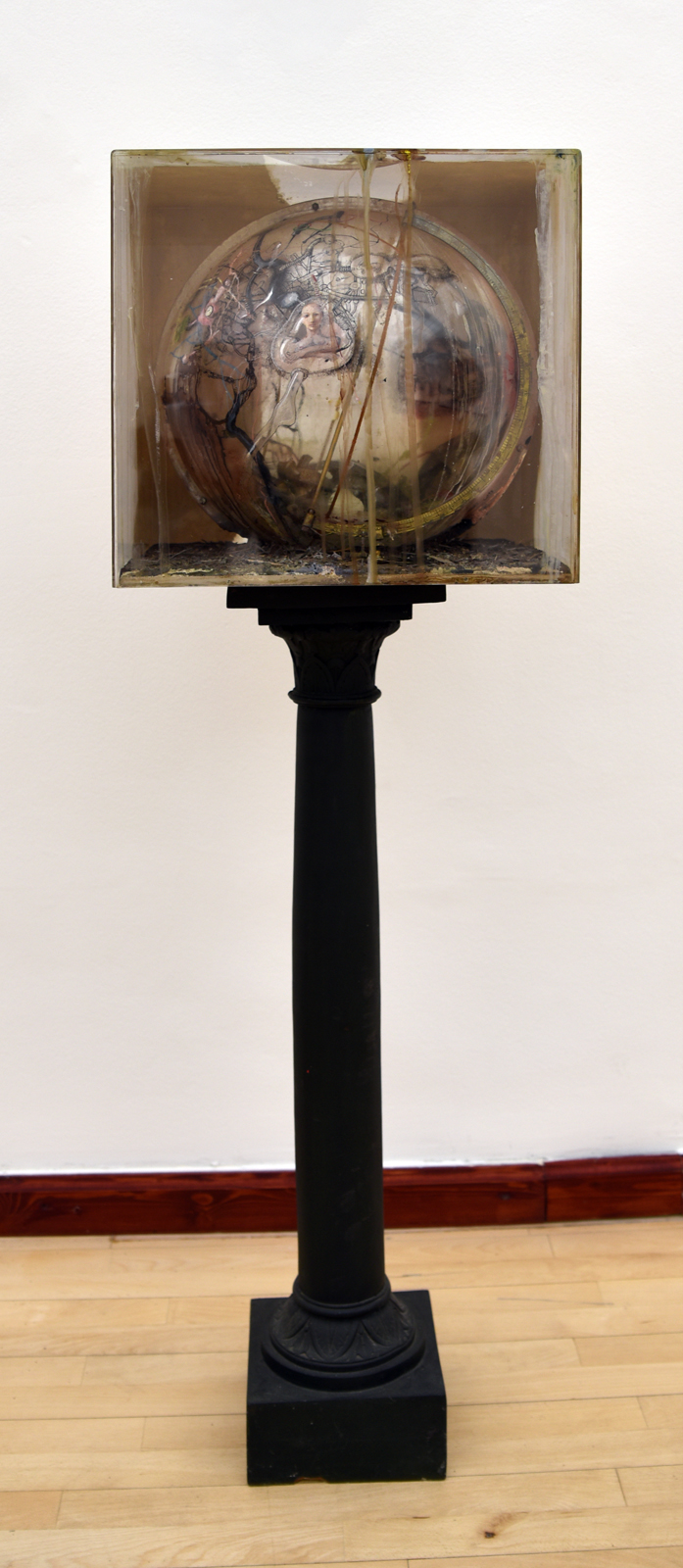
Autumn (1973)

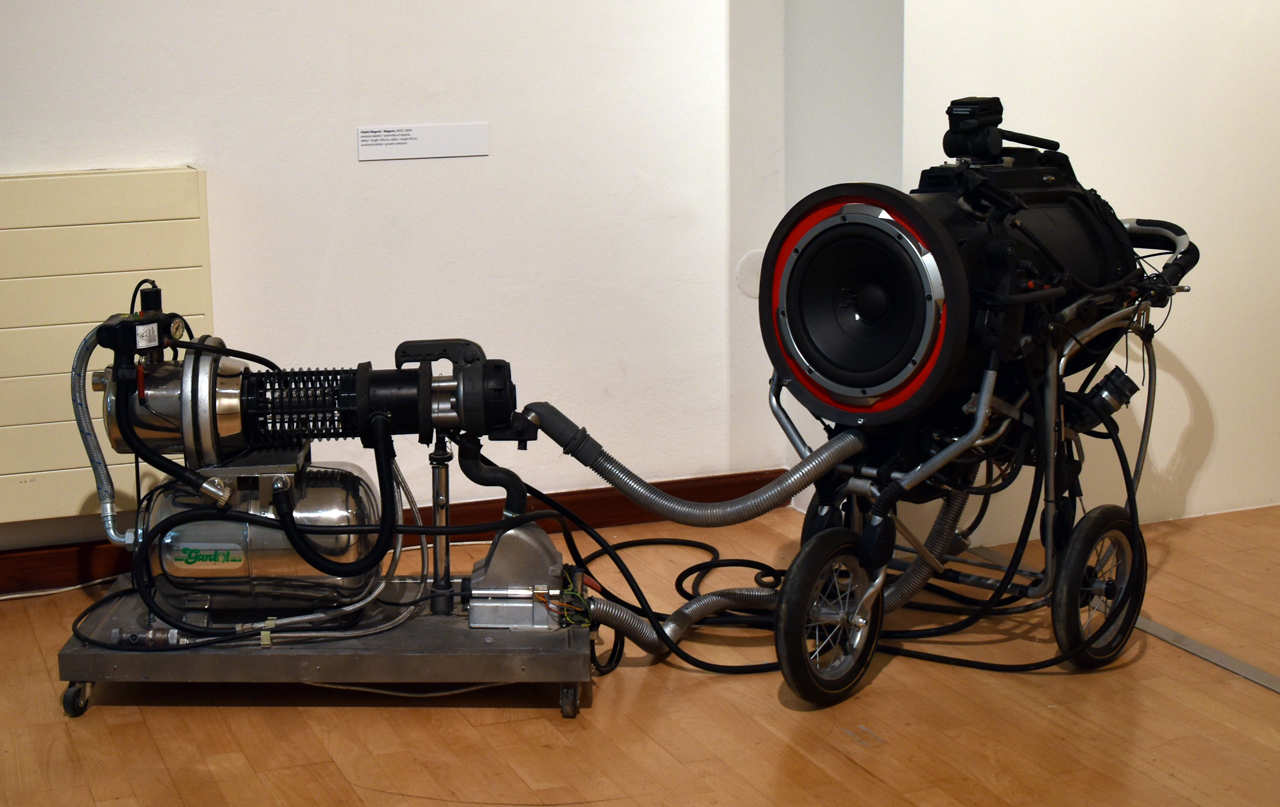
Object: Magoria (2003–2004)

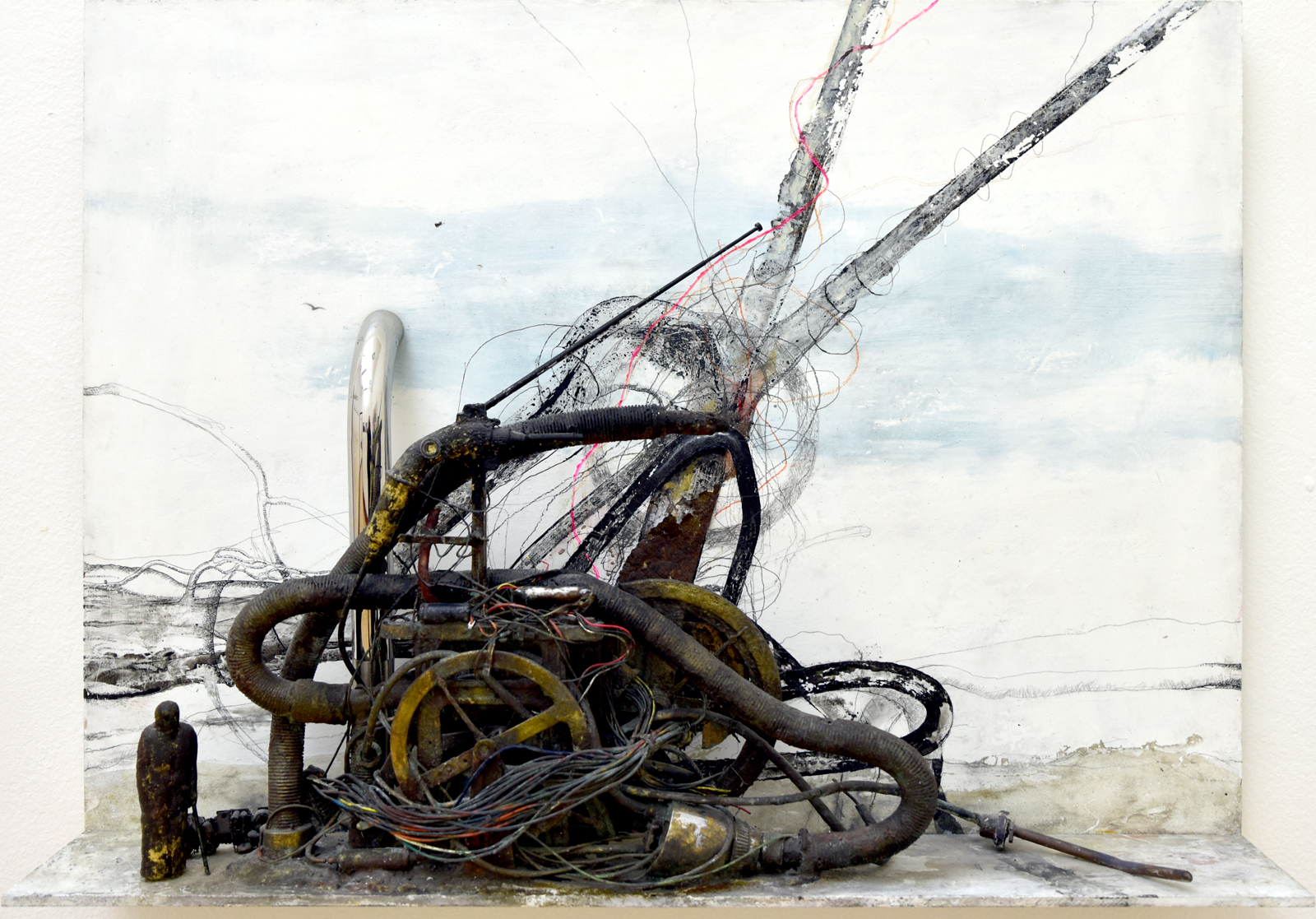
Custodian (2014)

=== Prints and film posters ===
Primarily in the late 1950s Bedřich Dlouhý produced small editions of drypoint prints (Execution, from the War cycle, 1958). He would periodically return to printmaking later, for instance in a print he made for the Club of the Friends of the New Group (Home, 2001).

In the 1960s he also designed film posters. It was well paid work that offered a measure of artistic freedom. By 1971 he had come up with 23 designs (Fellini's 8½, Resnais' Hiroshima mon amour, Kurosawa's Rashomon, The Pink Panther, Antonioni's Red Desert, etc.), and he was considered one of the world's top film poster artists. In 2010 Dlouhý's collected posters were exhibited in the foyer of the Světozor cinema in Prague.

=== Appraisal ===
In a 2002 catalogue Alena Potůčková summed up Bedřich Dlouhý and his work: The mature artist has left his peers behind, wanting only to be himself. He is lonely, and full of scepticism, and he questions the sense of what he is doing. He tests his skills; he submits himself to demanding examinations; he places obstacles in the way of his own talent. He strives for some grand testimony. He cares nothing for fashions, currents, trends. He wants to create beauty through pain. He wants his painting to become part of the great tradition that came before him. Essentially he cares about nothing else.

=== Collections ===
- Centre Georges Pompidou, Paris
- Musée d'Art Moderne de Paris
- Museum of Design, Zürich
- National Gallery in Prague
- Moravian Gallery in Brno
- Museum Kampa, Prague
- Museum Montanelli, Prague
- Regional galleries in the Czech Republic
- Private collections home and abroad

=== Important exhibitions ===
- 1965 Alternative attuali 2, Castello Spagnolo, L'Aquila
- 1965 IV. Biennale de Paris, Musée d'Art Moderne de la Ville de Paris
- 1965 Jeune avant-garde tchécoslovaque, Galerie Lambert, Paris
- 1966 Comparaisons, Musée d'Art Moderne de la Ville de Paris
- 1966 Tschechoslowakische Kunst der Gegenwart, Akademie der Künste, Berlin
- 1966 Nouvelle génération tchécoslovaque, Galerie Maya, Brussels
- 1967 Tjeckoslovakisk nutidskonst, Göteborg, Lund, Örebro, Varnamo, Norrköping, Nyköping, Hälsingborg, Stockholm
- 1968 Šmidrové / The Šmidras, The Václav Špála Gallery, Prague
- 1969 Art tchécoslovaque, Maison des Jeunes et de la Culture, Orléans
- 1969 Tschechische Malerei des 20. Jahrhunderts, Ausstellungsräume Berlin 12
- 1969 L´art tchèque actuel, Renault Champs-Élysées, Paris
- 1969 Arte contemporanea in Cecoslovacchia, Galleria Nazionale d'Arte Moderna e Contemporanea (GNAM), Rome
- 1969 Nová figurace / New Figuration, Mánes, Prague

== Sources ==
- Mahulena Nešlehová (ed.), Bedřich Dlouhý - Moje gusto / What I like, 137 pp, Prague City Gallery, 2019, ISBN 978-80-7010-155-1
- Fascinace skutečností - hyperrealismus v české malbě, Muzeum umění Olomouc, 2017
- Radim Španihel, Bedřich Dlouhý - Pokus o portrét, thesis, FF MUNI v Brně 2009
- Bedřich Dlouhý, Autoportrét V, kat. 62 pp., DrAK Foundation, Praha 2010, ISBN 978-80-254-6496-0
- Bedřich Dlouhý, Autoportrét IV, exhibition catalogue, Montanelli Gallery, Praha 2007
- Bedřich Dlouhý, Autoportrét III, exhibition catalogue, Galerie Nová síň, Praha 2004
- Bedřich Dlouhý, Autoportrét II, Alena Potůčková, catalogue, author's edition, Praha 2002
- Bedřich Dlouhý, Autoportrét, exhibition catalogue, Galerie Nová Síň v Praze 1999.
- Bedřich Dlouhý, Neaktuální umění, catalogue, author's edition, Praha 1998
- Vlastimil Tetiva, České malířství a sochařství 2. poloviny 20. století ze sbírek Alšovy jihočeské galerie -1.díl (exhibition catalogue), AJG v Hluboké nad Vltavou 1991
- Jan Kříž, Šmidrové, Obelisk, Praha 1970
- Kříž J, Šmejkal F, Jeune avant-garde Tche'coslovaque, exhibition catalogue, Galerie Lambert, Paris 1965
