= Radek Dlouhý =

Czech ice hockey player

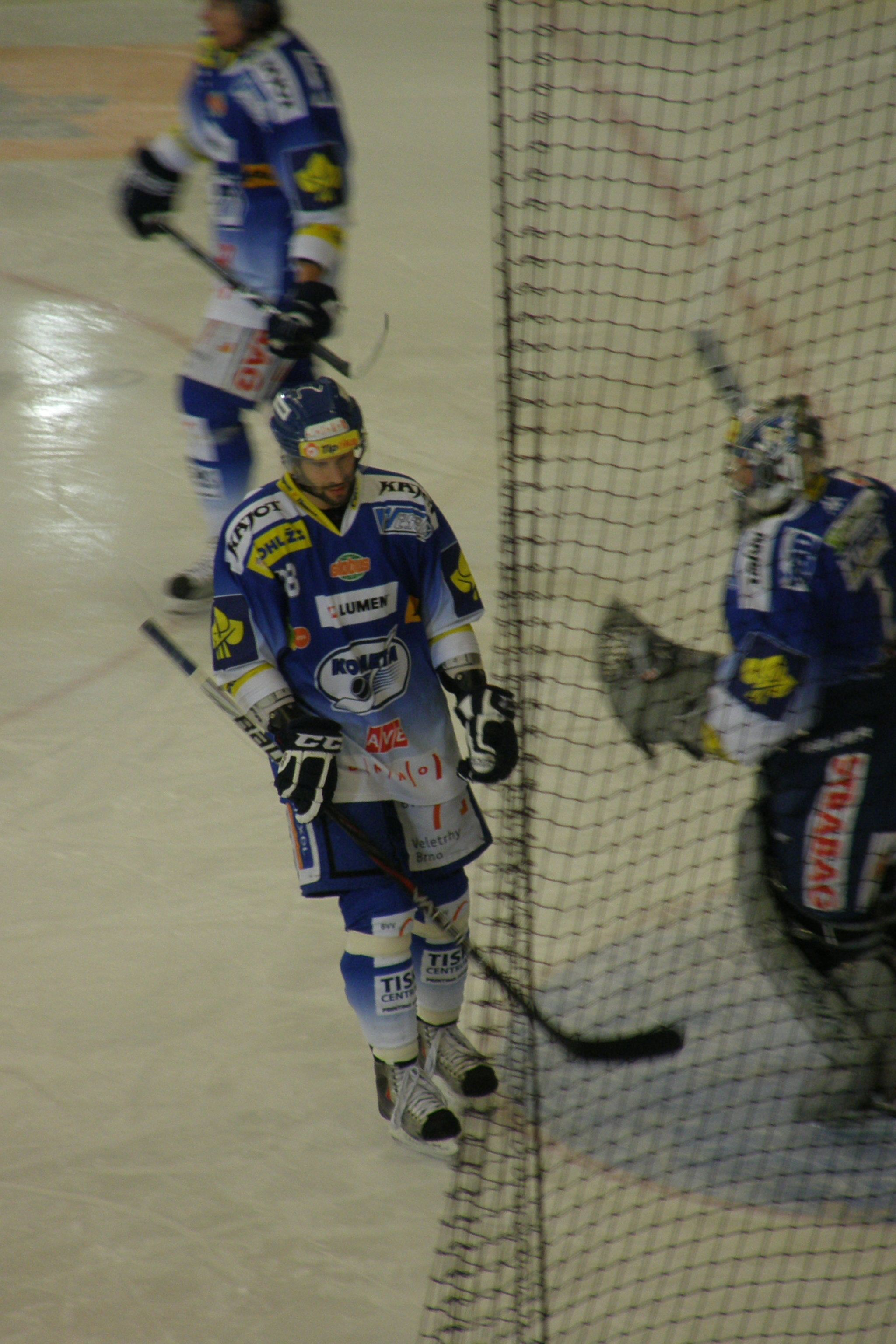
- Born: January 13, 1982 (age 44) Prague, Czechoslovakia
- Height: 6 ft 1 in (185 cm)
- Weight: 176 lb (80 kg; 12 st 8 lb)
- Position: Forward
- Shot: Left
- Played for: HC Slavia Praha; HC Kometa Brno; HC Energie Karlovy Vary; HC Olomouc
- NHL draft: Undrafted
- Playing career: 2000–2019

Radek Dlouhý (born 13 January 1982, in Prague) is a former Czech professional ice hockey player who played in the Czech Extraliga (ELH).

Dlouhý previously played for HC Slavia Praha, KLH Chomutov, HC Rebel Havlíčkův Brod, SK Kadaň, and HC Kometa Brno.
