= Adam Dlouhý =

Czech ice hockey player

- Born: 29 November 1994 (age 30); Liberec, Czech Republic
- Height: 5 ft 10 in (178 cm)
- Weight: 190 lb (86 kg; 13 st 8 lb)
- Position: Forward
- Shoots: Left
- Czech team (P) Cur. team Former teams: HC Bílí Tygři Liberec; HC Benátky nad Jizerou (Chance Liga); Piráti Chomutov
- Playing career: 2013–present

Adam Dlouhý (born 29 November 1994) is a Czech professional ice hockey player. He is currently playing for HC Benátky nad Jizerou of the Chance Liga, on loan from HC Bílí Tygři Liberec of the Czech Extraliga.

Dlouhý made his Czech Extraliga debut playing with HC Bílí Tygři Liberec during the 2014–15 Czech Extraliga season.
