= List of University of Utah people =

The University of Utah, located in Salt Lake City, Utah, is a flagship public space-grant research university. The school is notable for having been one of the first four nodes of the ARPANET and the first node outside of California, as well as forming the first computer graphics research group.

The University of Utah offers more than 100 undergraduate majors and more than 92 graduate degree programs, and includes three professional graduate schools: the University of Utah School of Medicine, the David Eccles School of Business, and the S.J. Quinney College of Law. The enrollment for 2016 was 23,789 undergraduate and 8,071 graduate students, with 1,505 full-time faculty members and 5,230 staff.

== Notable alumni ==
Famous U of U Alumni

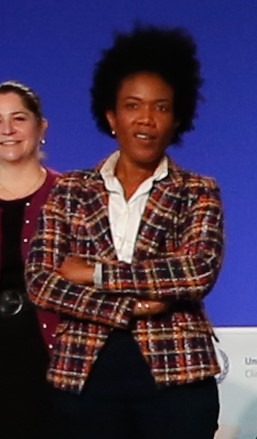
Marsha K. Caddle

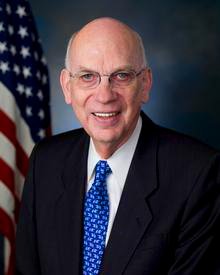
Bob Bennett

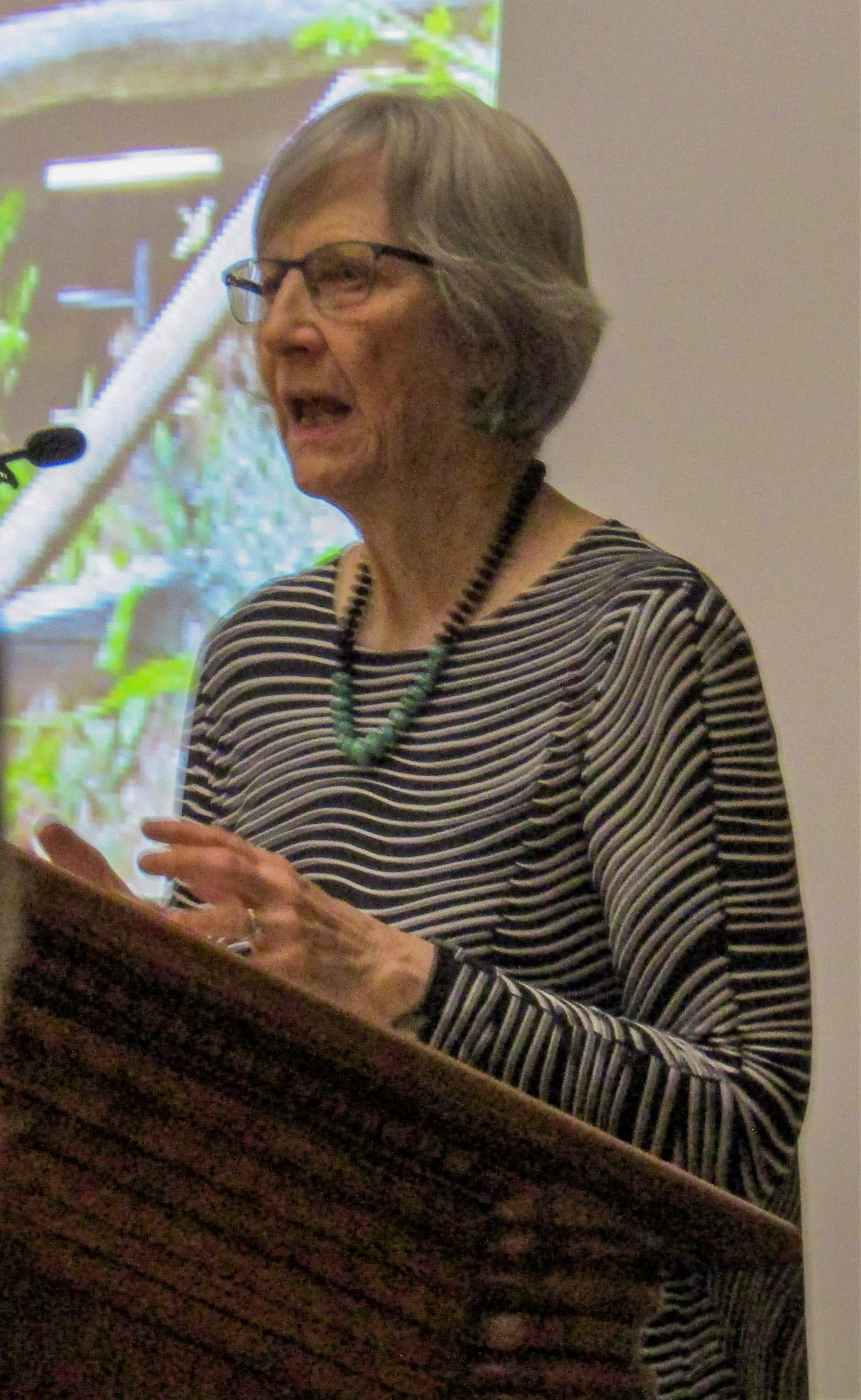
Laurel Thatcher Ulrich

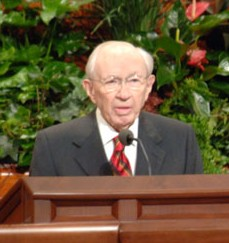
Gordon B. Hinckley

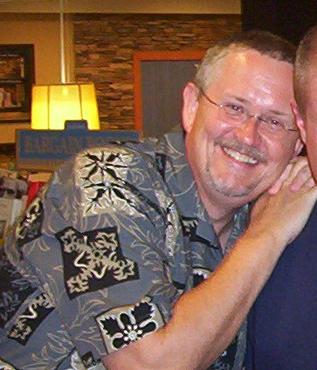
Orson Scott Card

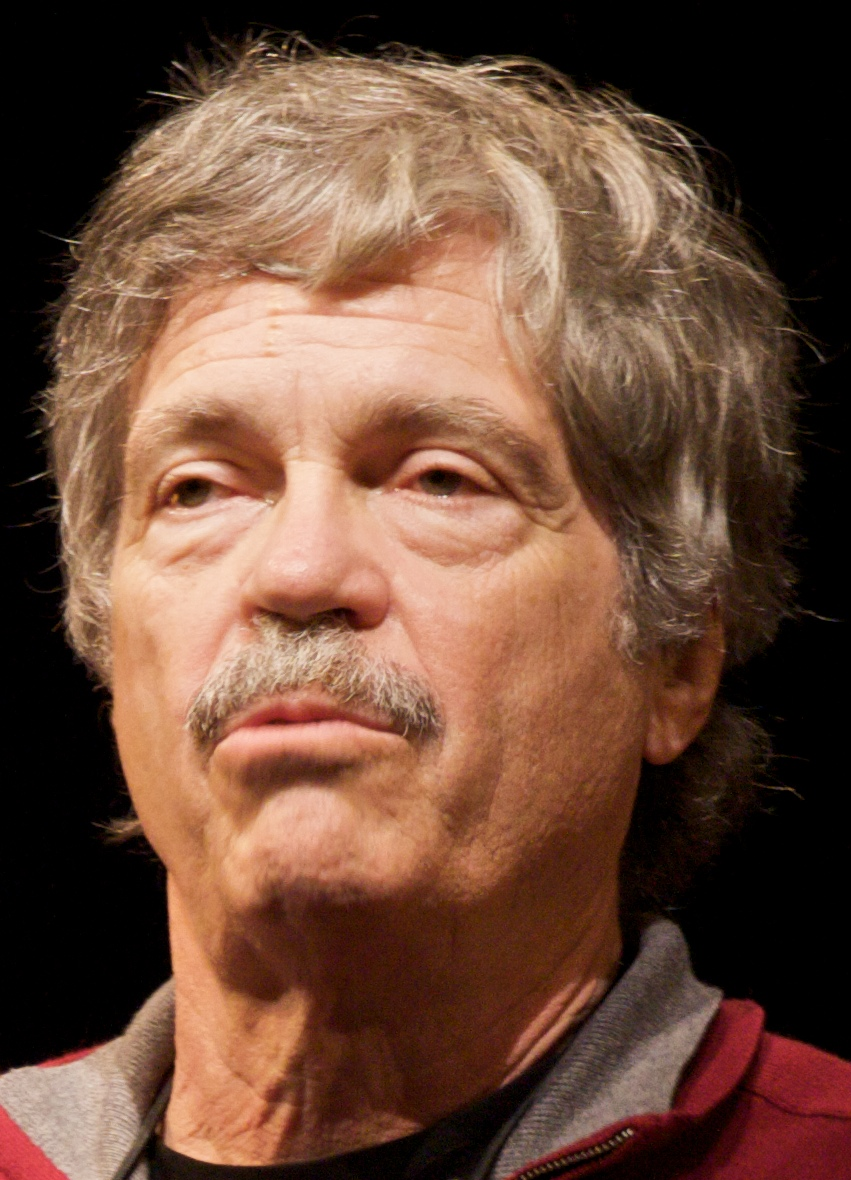
Alan C. Kay

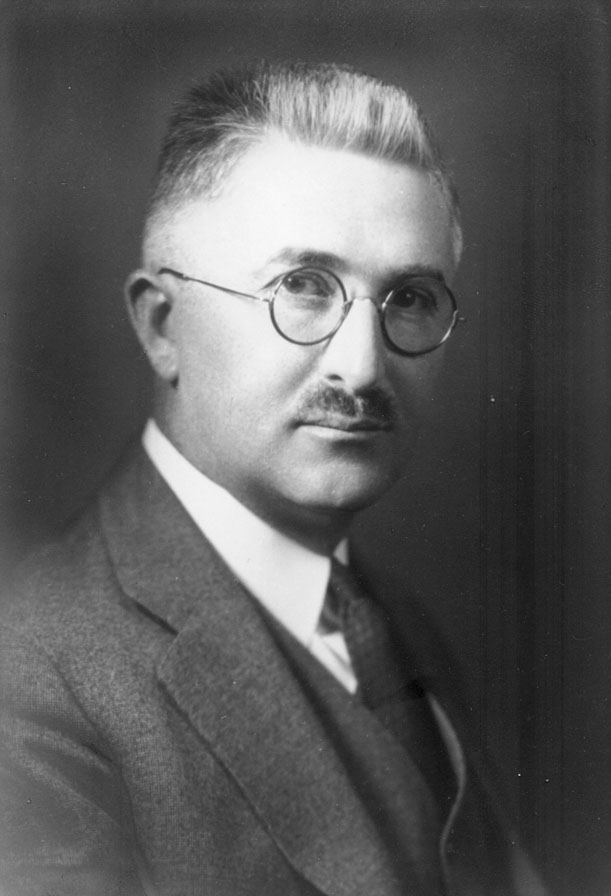
Ralph Hartley

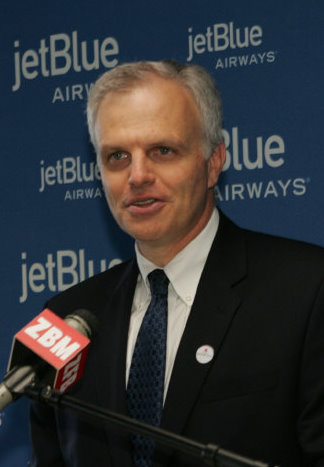
David Neelman

Andre Dyson

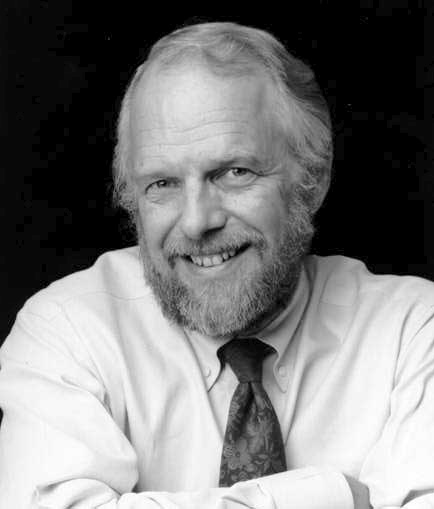
John Warnock

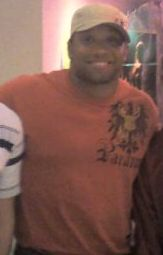
Jamal Anderson

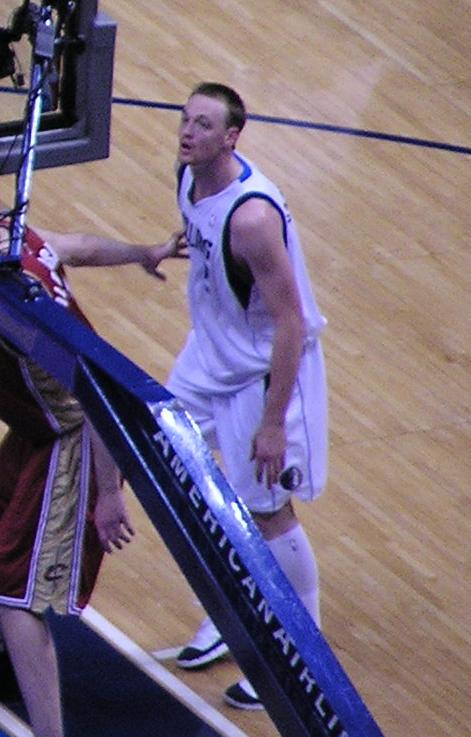
Keith Van Horn

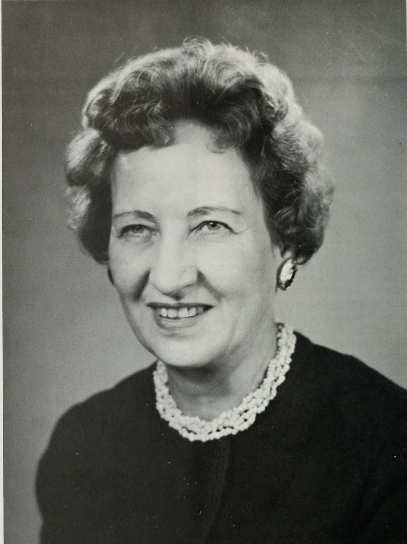
Virginia Cutler

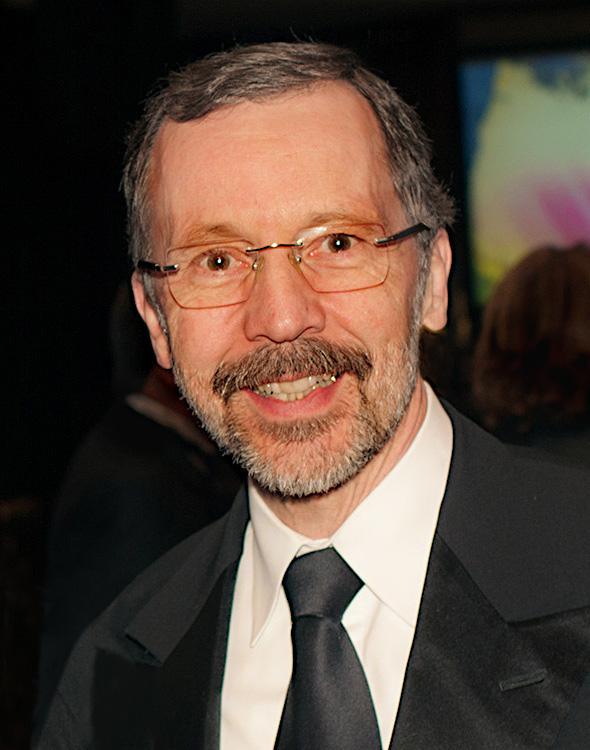
Ed Catmull

=== Law and government ===
- Ross "Rocky" Anderson – mayor, Salt Lake City (2000–2008)
- Nada Bakos – Central Intelligence Agency analyst and target officer
- Norman H. Bangerter – governor of Utah (1985–1993)
- Ralph Becker – mayor, Salt Lake City (2008–2016)
- Bob Bennett – U.S. senator, R-UT (1993–2011)
- Wallace F. Bennett – U.S. senator, R-UT (1951–1974)
- Marsha K. Caddle – Barbados' Minister of Finance, Economic Affairs and Investment
- Anson Vasco Call II – first mayor of Afton, Wyoming; served nine terms; graduated with the first class in 1875
- Adam M. Duncan – founder of the Utah branches of the ACLU and the NAACP
- William T. Fairbourn – major general in the Marine Corps
- Karl A. Fox – senior staff economist in the U.S. Council of Economic Advisers (1953–1955), Fellow of the American Statistical Association
- Ray D. Free – major general in the U.S. Army Reserve, member of the Utah House of Representatives
- E. Jake Garn – former U.S. senator, R-UT (1974–1993), and astronaut
- Larry Echo Hawk – Idaho attorney general (1991–1995), head of the Bureau of Indian Affairs (2009–2012)
- Jon Huntsman Jr. – governor of Utah (2005–2009), U.S. ambassador to Russia
- Dale A. Kimball – judge for the U.S. District Court for the District of Utah
- Edward L. Kimball – law professor at the University of Montana, University of Wisconsin, and Brigham Young University
- David S. King – U.S. representative, D-UT (1959–1967)
- William H. King – U.S. senator, D-UT (1917–1941)
- George W. Latimer – original member of the U.S. Court of Military Appeals, member of the Utah Supreme Court, and represented Lt. William Calley Jr. during his court martial for the My Lai incident
- Myron E. Leavitt – lieutenant governor of Nevada; justice, Nevada Supreme Court
- Mark Maryboy – politician from San Juan County, Utah; former Navajo Nation Council delegate
- Scott M. Matheson – governor of Utah (1977–1985)
- Herbert B. Maw – governor of Utah (1941–1949)
- Oscar W. McConkie Jr. – attorney for the LDS Church; former president of the Utah State Senate
- Frank Moss – U.S. senator, D-UT (1959–1977)
- Cal Rampton – governor of Utah (1965–1977)
- Joseph Lafayette Rawlins – U.S. senator, R-UT (1897–1903)
- Karl Rove – chief political strategist and adviser to George W. Bush; attended but never graduated
- Adam Schroadter – member of the New Hampshire House of Representatives
- Judy Shelton – economic advisor to Donald Trump
- Laura Smith – member of the Montana House of Representatives
- I. Daniel Stewart – Utah Supreme Court justice
- Ted Stewart – judge for the U.S. District Court for the District of Utah
- David N. Sundwall – executive director, Utah Department of Health and former Assistant Surgeon General
- Elbert D. Thomas – U.S. senator from Utah (1933–1951)
- Clark Waddoups – judge for the U.S. District Court for the District of Utah
- Olene Walker – governor of Utah (2003–2005)
- Heber Manning Wells – governor of Utah (1896–1905)
- Bob Wright – Utah lawyer, Republican gubernatorial candidate in 1980, biographer of David O. McKay
- Michael David Zimmerman – former chief justice of the Utah Supreme Court

=== Business ===
- Doug Bowser – businessman, CEO of Nintendo America

=== Humanities and fine arts ===
- Craig Arnold – poet
- Fawn Brodie – historian and author
- Vern Bullough – historian and sexologist
- Orson Scott Card – science fiction author, Ender's Game
- April Christofferson – novelist
- Terese Coe – poet
- Marc J. Gregson – novelist
- Shannon Hale – author
- Paul Y. Hammond – political scientist and national security scholar
- Andrew Hunt – historian; vegan/animal rights advocate
- Betsy James – writer and illustrator
- Glen M. Leonard – historian of Utah and Mormonism
- Paul McCarthy – artist
- Carole Doyle Peel – artist
- Linda Sillitoe – journalist, poet, and historian
- Shelby Steele – author and columnist; research fellow at the Hoover Institution
- Wallace Stegner – novelist
- LeConte Stewart – artist primarily known for his landscapes of rural Utah; head of the Art Department at the University of Utah, 1938–1956
- Laurel Thatcher Ulrich – Pulitzer Prize-winning historian of women and early America
- Larry Watson – Milkweed National Fiction Prize-winning author
- Robison Wells – novelist
- Terry Tempest Williams – author, environmentalist
- Susie Wind – Seattle artist, noted for "urban realism"
- Don Carlos Young – architect, noted for his work for the LDS Church

=== Life and physical sciences ===
- Allen V. Astin – physicist, fifth director of the United States National Bureau of Standards (now the National Institute of Standards and Technology)
- James F. Bonner – plant biochemist noted for discovering an efficient process for collecting natural rubber from trees
- Michael Doleac – former professional basketball player for the Miami Heat and high school physics teacher in Park City, Utah
- Tom Garrison – marine scientist, distinguished professor, author of 15 textbooks, and writer of Emmy Award-winning PBS show Oceanus
- Willis J. Gertsch – arachnologist who described over 1,000 species of arachnids, including the brown recluse spider and the tooth cave spider
- Michael Ghiselin – California Academy of Sciences biologist internationally recognized for work on sea slugs; has had both a species (Hypselodoris ghiselini) and the defensive chemical that it contains (ghiselinin) named after him
- Tracy Hall – invented synthetic diamonds
- Jaqueline Kiplinger – chemist at the Los Alamos National Laboratory
- Don L. Lind – scientist and a former naval officer and aviator, and NASA astronaut
- Calvin Quate – co-inventor of the atomic force microscope
- William T. Silfvast – physicist noted for significant contributions to gas discharge lasers, Distinguished Staff at Bell Labs
- Stanley Smith Stevens – developed Stevens's power law for psychoacoustics
- Alvin V. Tollestrup – developed superconducting magnets for the Fermilab Tevatron and helped found the Collider Detector at Fermilab
- Thomas Ypsilantis – co-discovered the antiproton
- Lindsay Zanno – vertebrate paleontologist known for innovative use of X-ray computed tomography in reconstructing dinosaurs

=== Mathematics ===
- Richard Eliot Chamberlin – geometric topologist, visiting scholar at the Institute for Advanced Study, and Invited Speaker at the International Congress of Mathematicians
- Alessio Corti – geometer at Imperial College London and winner of the London Mathematical Society Whitehead Prize
- John E. Dennis – editor-in-chief and founder of the SIAM Journal on Optimization, pioneered convergence analysis of quasi-Newton methods
- Gordana Matic – geometric topologist, C. L. E. Moore instructor at MIT, Fellow of the American Mathematical Society

=== Computer science ===
- Robert Adamson – computer scientist; developed Gener/OL, one of the first interpreted programming languages
- Alan Ashton – computer scientist; co-founder of WordPerfect and Thanksgiving Point
- Brian A. Barsky – professor at the University of California, Berkeley, working in computer graphics, geometric modeling, optometry, and vision science
- David M. Beazley – author of Python Essential Reference, the SWIG software tool for creating Python C extensions, and the PLY parsing tool; fellow of the Python Software Foundation and two-time awardee of the IEEE Gordon Bell Prize
- Jim Blinn – computer scientist; MacArthur Fellow; known for his work on Carl Sagan's Cosmos documentary and inventing the first method for representing surface textures in graphical images
- Edwin Catmull – co-founder of Pixar
- Jim Clark – computer scientist; entrepreneur; founder of several technology companies, including Silicon Graphics, Inc., Netscape Communications Corporation, myCFO, and Healtheon
- Frank Crow – computer scientist; developed anti-aliasing methods for computer graphics
- Alan L. Davis – computer architect, associate director of the University of Utah School of Computing
- Alyosha Efros – computer vision researcher and winner of the ACM Prize in Computing
- David Evans – computer scientist and graphics pioneer; co-founder of Evans and Sutherland
- Olivier Faugeras – computational neuroscientist and computer vision researcher, member of the French Academy of Sciences and the French Academy of Technologies, and recipient of the 2014 Okawa Prize
- Justin Frankel – developed Winamp media player and gnutella peer-to-peer network; founder of Cockos Incorporated, which creates music production and development software such as the REAPER digital audio workstation
- Henry Fuchs – computer scientist; member of the National Academy of Engineering
- Amy Ashurst Gooch – developed Gooch shading for non-photorealistic rendering
- Henri Gouraud – computer scientist; inventor of Gouraud shading
- Charles D. Hansen – co-editor of The Visualization Handbook
- Paul Hudak – co-designer of the Haskell programming language
- Robert Royce Johnson – computer engineer, inventor of the Johnson counter, and Utah computer science professor
- Jim Kajiya – computer scientist; developed the frame buffer concept for storing and displaying single-raster images and the rendering equation
- Alan Kay – computer scientist; recipient of the Turing Award; credited with the concept of the laptop computer
- Gordon Kindlmann – developed the tensor glyph
- Miriah Meyer – computer scientist, pioneer in interactive visualization for basic research
- Martin Newell – computer scientist and graphics pioneer; creator of the Utah Teapot
- Frederic Parke – made the first 3D animation of a human face
- Bui Tuong Phong – computer scientist; inventor of the Phong reflection model and the Phong shading interpolation method
- Jim Waldo – lead software architect of Jini, CTO of Harvard University
- John Warnock – computer scientist; co-founder of Adobe Systems Inc.
- Telle Whitney – CEO and president of the Anita Borg Institute for Women and Technology

=== Engineering ===
- Rodney Bagley – co-inventor of the catalytic converter
- Mary Blade – mechanical engineering professor at the Cooper Union noted for work in industrial design education
- John C. Cook – played a crucial role in establishing the field of ground-penetrating radar
- Mark W. Fuller – CEO of WET Design, creators of Fountains of Bellagio in Las Vegas
- Wilbert L. Gore – co-inventor of Gore-Tex fabrics
- Ralph Hartley – co-founder of information theory (with Shannon and Hamming); inventor of Hartley transform and Hartley oscillator
- George Smoot Horsley – one of the original four employees of Shockley Semiconductor Laboratory, physicist, and pioneer in printed circuitry and semiconductors
- Akhlesh Lakhtakia – developed visualization technique for latent fingerprints in forensics
- Gretchen W. McClain – president and CEO of Xylem Inc., former NASA Deputy Associate Administrator for Space Development
- Antonio Nieto – former Director of FLS Mining and Minerals Technology and Research Center
- Simon Ramo – father of the intercontinental ballistic missile (ICBM)
- Ingo Titze – executive director of the National Center for Voice and Speech
- Mac Van Valkenburg – member of the National Academy of Engineering and IEEE James H. Mulligan Jr. Education Medal laureate
- Xuejun Wen – bioengineer, the William H. Goodwin Professor at the Institute for Engineering and Medicine, Virginia Commonwealth University

=== Medicine ===
- T. Brian Callister – physician; health care quality expert
- R Adams Cowley – researcher in emergency medicine; pioneer in shock trauma treatment
- William DeVries – performed the first successful permanent artificial heart implant
- Talmage Egan – anesthesiologist and professor
- Robert Jarvik – inventor of the artificial heart
- Lewis Judd – neurobiologist and psychiatrist, Director of the National Institute of Mental Health, pioneered biomedical study of mental illness
- Grant Liddle – endocrinologist
- Russell M. Nelson – physician and cardiothoracic surgeon; 17th president of the LDS Church
- Cecil O. Samuelson – former president of Brigham Young University
- Sylvester Sanfilippo – pediatrician who described Sanfilippo syndrome
- Ellis Reynolds Shipp – one of the first female doctors in Utah

=== Media ===
- Braden Barty – director and producer most notably of Flipping Vegas, Far Away Eyes, and Spirit Space
- Amy Bender – sports reporter and producer
- T. C. Christensen – Mormon filmmaker
- Laura Chukanov – Miss Utah USA 2009
- Lee Isaac Chung – film director, most notably the 2021 Academy Award Best Picture nominee Minari
- Keene Curtis – stage, film and television actor
- Farhang Holakouee – host of popular Iranian radio programs
- Jason Todd Ipson – licensed physician and screenwriter, transitioned from a surgical residency to the USC School of Cinematic Arts and went on to form Asgaard Entertainment as well as write/direct the theatrically released feature films Unrest and Everybody Wants to be Italian
- Joseph Kearns – radio, film and television actor
- Steven Koecher – journalist missing since 2009
- Mills Lane – television judge; boxing referee
- Bronzell Miller – actor, NFL player
- Neal Moore – journalist, writer and canoeist
- Kevin Murphy – castmember and writer for Mystery Science Theater 3000 and RiffTrax
- George Ouzounian, aka Maddox – humorist (attended but did not graduate)
- Holly Rowe – sideline reporter for ESPN
- Mary Thurman – silent film actress
- Bob Trumpy – former NFL tight end; current sports broadcasting color commentator

=== Education ===
- Merrill J. Bateman – president of Brigham Young University (1996–2003); LDS general authority
- Milton Bennion – longtime dean of the school of education
- Stanford Cazier – president of California State University, Chico (1971–1979) and Utah State University (1979–1992)
- G. Homer Durham – president of Arizona State University (1960–1969); professor and administrator at the University of Utah; and LDS general authority
- Teppo Felin – professor at the University of Oxford
- Kathleen Flake – chair of Mormon studies at the University of Virginia
- Lily Eskelsen García – vice president of the National Education Association
- Gordon Gee – has been the president of more universities than any other American
- Ann Weaver Hart – first female president of Temple University
- Francis Longstaff – finance academic
- Sterling M. McMurrin – former E.E. Erickson Professor of Philosophy and U of Utah administrator; U.S. Commissioner of Education; Mormon philosopher
- Darron Smith
- Placida Garcia Smith – Phoenix, Arizona community organizer
- Steven C. Wheelwright – president of Brigham Young University-Hawaii (2007–)
- O. Meredith Wilson – president of the University of Oregon (1954–1960) and the University of Montana (1960–1967)

=== Athletics ===
- Jamal Anderson – former NFL running back
- Mike Anderson – former NFL running back and 2002 NFL Rookie of the Year
- Marv Bateman – former NFL punter
- Zane Beadles – Jacksonville Jaguars offensive lineman
- Daria Bijak – German gymnast; four-time German World Championships team member (2002, 2003, 2005, 2006); 2008 Olympic Team member
- Andrew Bogut – NBA center, most recently with the Golden State Warriors; first overall pick in the 2005 NBA draft; left early for the NBA and did not graduate
- Garett Bolles – Denver Broncos offensive lineman
- Anthony Brown – NFL offensive lineman
- Carlon Brown – basketball player, 2013–14 top scorer in the Israel Basketball Premier League
- Blake Burdette – USA Rugby; current member of the United States National Rugby Team; four-time All-American at Utah
- Josh Burkman – former football player; current mixed martial artist formerly with World Series of Fighting and Ultimate Fighting Championship
- Jerry Chambers – former NBA player; NCAA basketball tournament Most Outstanding Player in 1966
- Tom Chambers – former NBA all-star
- Jonas Chatterton – college basketball head coach
- Norm Chow – college football coach Utah, offensive coordinator; NCAA All-America honorable mention as an offensive line
- Will Clyburn – professional basketball player, 2016 top scorer in the Israel Basketball Premier League, 2019 EuroLeague Final Four MVP
- C. J. Cron – MLB first baseman
- Michael Doleac – NBA player; AP All-American Honorable Mention and GTE First Team Academic All-American
- Andre Dyson – NFL defensive back
- Kevin Dyson – former NFL wide receiver
- Luther Elliss – former NFL defensive lineman
- Charlie Evans – former NFL running back
- Manny Fernandez – former NFL player for the Miami Dolphins defensive lineman
- Arnie Ferrin – former NBA player, four-time NCAA All-American
- Marv Fleming – NFL tight end, first player in NFL history to play in 5 Super Bowls
- Chris Fuamatu-Ma'afala – former NFL running back
- Scott Garson – college basketball coach
- Caroline Gleich – professional skier, mountaineer, and environmentalist
- Jordan Gross – former NFL offensive lineman
- Dominique Hatfield – NFL defensive back
- Manny Hendrix – former NFL cornerback
- Brian Johnson – NFL and College Football coach
- Jack Johnson – former NFL offensive tackle
- Jeff Judkins – former NBA player
- Kyle Kuzma – Washington Wizards forward
- Hilary Lindh – FIS Alpine World Ski Champion and 1992 Winter Olympic medalist
- Joe Machnik – National Soccer Hall of Fame, Fox Sports broadcaster
- John Madsen – wide receiver, Oakland Raiders
- Billy McGill – All-American basketball player and NBA
- Andre Miller – former NBA guard, NCAA All-American
- Scott Mitchell – back-up quarterback to Dan Marino on the Miami Dolphins and later started at QB for the Detroit Lions
- Gota Miura – Japanese Olympic skier
- Charles K. Monfort – chairman and CEO of the Colorado Rockies Major League Baseball
- Hanno Möttölä – former player in the NBA and with many European professional teams
- Mike Newlin – former NBA player with the Houston Rockets, New Jersey Nets, and New York Knicks
- Terry Nofsinger – NFL quarterback for St. Louis in the 1960s
- Jared Norris – former NFL linebacker
- Sean O'Connell – mixed martial artist
- Derrick Odum – College Football coach
- Ralph Olsen – former NFL defensive end
- Tenny Palepoi – NFL defensive end
- Jakob Pöltl – San Antonio Spurs center/forward; left early for the NBA and did not graduate
- Ashley Postell – gymnast; balance beam champion; 2002 World Artistic Gymnastics Championships, Debrecen, Hungary
- Aldo Richins – NFL wingback, first Mexican to play in the NFL
- Dick Romney – member of the College Football Hall of Fame
- George Seifert – former NFL head coach of the San Francisco 49ers and the Carolina Panthers
- Sharrieff Shah – football coach; husband to Jen Shah
- Chris Shelton – MLB baseball player, first baseman
- Alex Smith – former Washington Redskins quarterback, first overall pick in the 2005 NFL draft
- Dave Smith – former NFL running back
- Kim Smith – Sacramento Monarchs, four-Time Mountain West Conference Player of the Year, 13th pick of 2006 WNBA draft
- Steve Smith Sr. – former NFL wide receiver
- Paul Soliai – NFL defensive tackle
- Bill Spencer – biathlete who competed at the 1964 and 1968 Winter Olympics
- George Theodore – Played for the Utes baseball team and earned a Master of Social Work in 1978
- Shona Thorburn – Minnesota Lynx seventh overall pick of 2006 WNBA Draft
- Patrik Trhac – professional tennis player
- Dakarai Tucker (born 1994) – basketball player for Hapoel Haifa of the Israeli Basketball Premier League
- Keith Van Horn – former NBA player
- Danny Vranes – former NBA player
- Eric Weddle – former safety for the Los Angeles Rams
- Larry Wilson – Pro Football Hall of Fame member; All-Pro free safety
- Delon Wright – Dallas Mavericks guard

=== Music and entertainment ===
- Peter Breinholt – folk recording artist
- Matthew Davis – actor noted for roles in Legally Blonde and The Vampire Diaries
- Dan Farr – co-founder of Salt Lake Comic Con and technology entrepreneur
- Denali Foxx, born Cordero Zuckerman – drag performer, contestant on the thirteenth season of RuPaul's Drag Race
- Kaskade, born Ryan Raddon – DJ
- Steven Sharp Nelson – cellist, member of The Piano Guys
- Josh Rosenthal – singer/songwriter
- Jen Shah – reality TV star on The Real Housewives of Salt Lake City

=== Religion ===
- Marvin J. Ashton – apostle of the LDS Church (1971–1994)
- M. Russell Ballard – apostle of the LDS Church (1985–)
- Adam S. Bennion – apostle of the LDS Church (1953–1958), and superintendent of Church Schools
- H. David Burton – presiding bishop of the LDS Church (1995–2012)
- Linda K. Burton – president of the Relief Society of the LDS Church (2012–2017)
- J. Reuben Clark – counselor in the First Presidency of the LDS Church (1934–1961)
- Matthew Cowley – apostle of the LDS Church (1945–1953)
- Henry B. Eyring – counselor in the First Presidency of the LDS Church (2007–)
- James E. Faust – counselor in the First Presidency of the LDS Church (1995–2007)
- Susa Young Gates – LDS writer, periodical editor, and women's rights advocate in Utah
- Robert D. Hales – apostle of the LDS Church (1994–2017)
- Gordon B. Hinckley – president of the LDS Church (1995–2008)
- Elaine L. Jack – president of the Relief Society of the LDS Church (1990–1997)
- Truman G. Madsen – longtime BYU religion professor and author
- Neal A. Maxwell – apostle of the LDS Church (1981–2004); LDS writer
- Bruce R. McConkie – apostle of the LDS Church (1972–1985); LDS author
- David O. McKay – president of the LDS Church (1951–1970)
- Coleen K. Menlove – president of the Primary organization of the LDS Church (1999–2005)
- Joseph F. Merrill – apostle of the LDS Church (1931–1952); key figure in the development of the Church Educational System
- Thomas S. Monson – president of the LDS Church (2008–2018)
- Henry D. Moyle – counselor in the First Presidency of the LDS Church (1959–1963)
- Dale G. Renlund – apostle of the LDS Church (2015–)
- George F. Richards – president of the Quorum of the Twelve Apostles of the LDS Church (1945–50)
- Stephen L Richards – counselor in the First Presidency of the LDS Church (1951–59)
- B. H. Roberts – general authority of the LDS Church (1888–1933); historian of Mormonism; politician
- Marion G. Romney – counselor in the First Presidency of the LDS Church (1972–1985)
- Eldred G. Smith – presiding patriarch of the LDS Church (1947–1979)
- George Albert Smith – president of the LDS Church (1945–1951)
- Joseph Fielding Smith – presiding patriarch of the LDS Church (1943–1946)
- Reed Smoot – apostle of the LDS Church (1900–1941); U.S. Senator from Utah (1903–1933)
- Belle S. Spafford – president of the Relief Society of the LDS Church (1945–1974)
- Sidney B. Sperry – longtime BYU religion professor and author
- Moses Thatcher – apostle of the LDS Church (1879–1896)
- Barbara W. Winder – president of the Relief Society of the LDS Church (1984–1990)
- Joseph B. Wirthlin – apostle of the LDS Church (1986–2008)

=== Criminals ===
- John Ronald Brown – surgeon and convicted murderer, known as "Butcher Brown" for his unorthodox surgical methods
- Ted Bundy – notorious serial killer; briefly attended Utah's law school prior to his 1975 arrest and conviction for kidnapping
- Thad Roberts – former NASA intern who stole and attempted to resell the collection of Apollo program Moon rocks valued at $21 million
- Nadir Soofi – Islamic extremist who attacked officers with gunfire at the entrance to an exhibit featuring cartoon images of Muhammad at the Curtis Culwell Center in Garland, Texas, on May 3, 2015

== Notable faculty ==
Notable U of U faculty

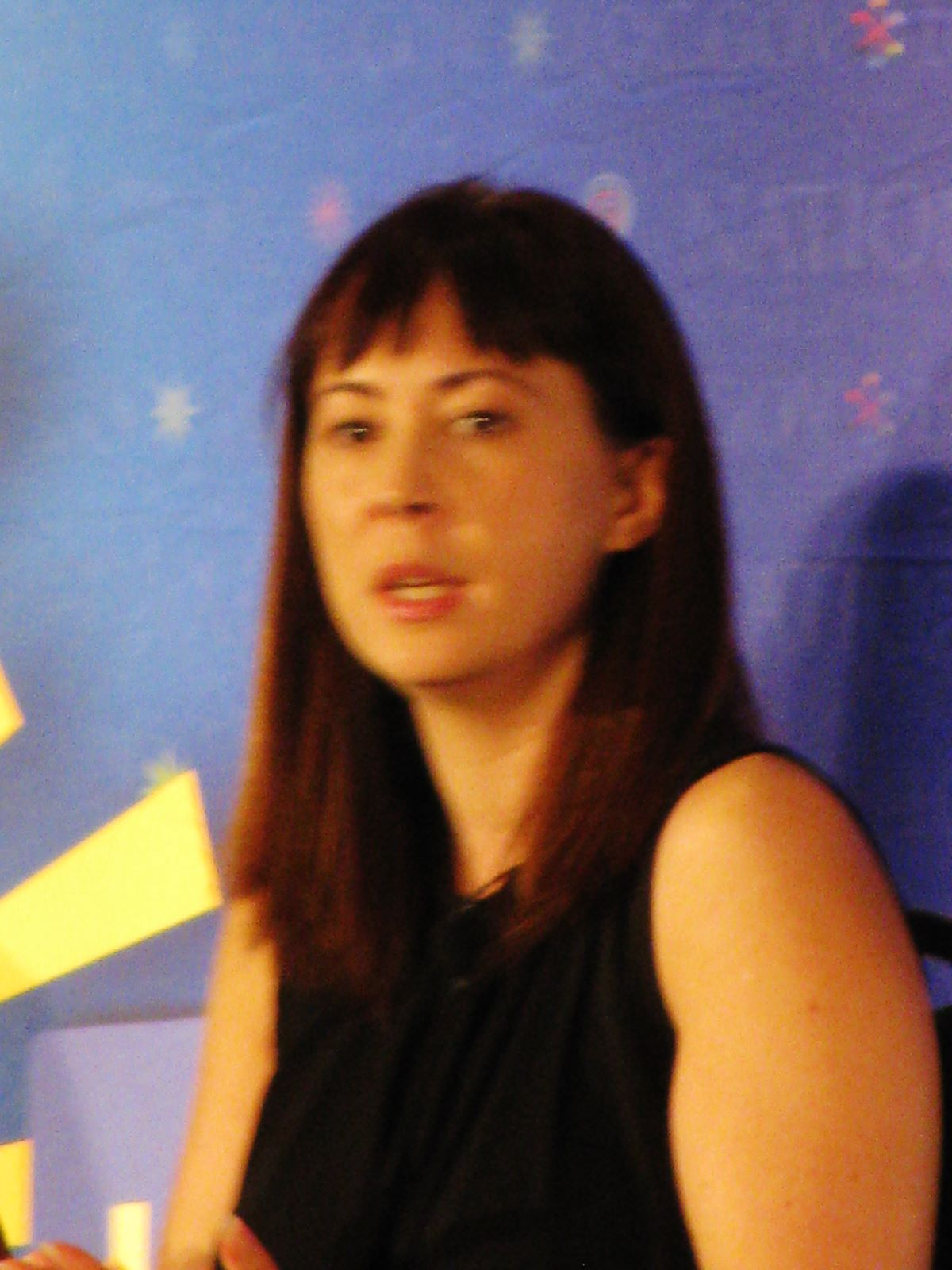
Paisley Rekdal

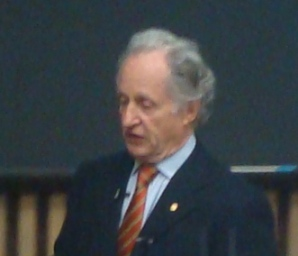
Mario Capecchi

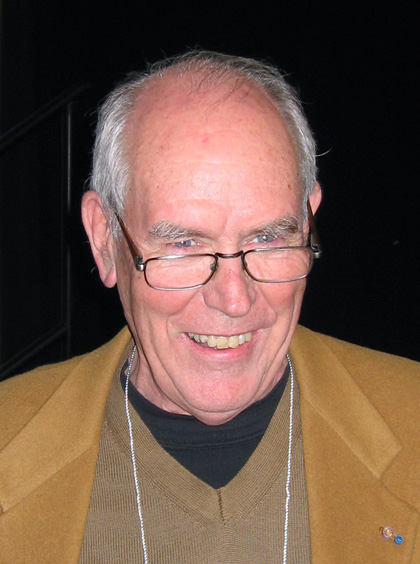
Ivan Sutherland

=== Humanities and fine arts ===
- Margaret "Peggy" Battin – distinguished professor of Philosophy and Ethics
- Ellen Bromberg – distinguished professor of dance, choreography, and ballet
- Jan Harold Brunvand – emeritus professor of English; folklorist and urban legends researcher
- Lyle Campbell – linguist and leading expert on American Indian languages, Leonard Bloomfield Book Award winner
- Paul G. Cassell – former United States federal judge
- William Henry Chamberlin – philosopher and theologian; alumnus
- Katharine Coles – third poet laureate of Utah, director of Harriet Monroe Poetry Institute
- Charles E. Dibble (1909–2002) – distinguished professor of Anthropology (1939–78), Mesoamericanist scholar
- Nadja Durbach – professor of British History, Guggenheim winner
- Craig Dworkin – professor of English, poet, critic, and editor
- Leslie Pickering Francis – distinguished professor of Philosophy and Law
- Eric Hinderaker – professor of Early American History
- Scott Jarvis – professor of Linguistics and expert in lexical diversity
- Jesse D. Jennings – archaeologist and anthropologist
- Dean L. May (1938–2003) – professor of History
- Elijah Millgram – professor of philosophy former Guggenheim Fellow
- Lance Olsen – professor, novelist, and poet
- Jacqueline Osherow – professor and poet.
- Sarah Projansky – professor in the department of film and media studies, as well as gender studies
- Paisley Rekdal – professor and poet, currently serving as poet laureate of Utah
- Willis W. Ritter – former United States federal judge
- Clarice Short – poet and professor of English
- Ronald Smelser – professor of history, Holocaust educator and author of The Myth of the Eastern Front
- Terry Tempest Williams – author, conservationist, and activist

=== Life and physical sciences ===
- Mary Beckerle – cancer biologist and CEO of the Huntsman Cancer Institute; discovered the role of FLI1 in the development of Ewing's sarcoma
- Richard H. Boyd – chemist; distinguished professor at the university
- Thure E. Cerling – geologist who developed the study of the geological record of ecological change
- Ralph V. Chamberlin – taxonomist; former Dean of U of U's College of Medicine
- Dale Clayton – taxonomist of Strigiphilus garylarsoni
- Stephen David Durrant – mammalogist specializing in rodents of the Great Basin
- Alexei L. Efros – Landau Prize laureate
- James Ehleringer – developed methods for stable isotope forensics and ecology, Member of the National Academy of Sciences
- Sharon Emerson – biologist noted for contributions in ecomorphology, MacArthur Fellowship recipient
- Henry Eyring – theoretical chemist; twenty-year dean of the graduate school
- Martin Fleischmann and Stanley Pons – noted for controversial and irreplicable work on cold fusion in the 1980s and 1990s
- Eugene Loh – led the development of the Fly's Eye Cosmic Ray Detector, which observed the Oh-My-God particle, the most energetic cosmic ray ever detected
- Susan Mango – developmental biologist who worked on Caenorhabditis elegans organ development
- Emanuel Margoliash – devised the Fitch–Margoliash method for constructing evolutionary trees based on protein sequences
- Nalini Nadkarni – pioneered the study of Costa Rican rain forest canopies, Guggenheim Fellow
- Baldomero Olivera – discovered and first characterized E. coli DNA ligase, a key enzyme of genetic engineering and recombinant DNA technology
- Thomas J. Parmley – physics professor and chair of the department
- Richard H. Price – physicist, author, editor of the American Journal of Physics, and research affiliate at MIT
- Jon Seger – evolutionary ecologist noted for work on bet-hedging
- Pierre Sokolsky – led the High Resolution Fly's Eye Cosmic Ray Detector project that made the first observation of the GZK cutoff
- Peter Stang – editor of the Journal of the American Chemical Society; recipient of the National Medal of Science

=== Mathematics ===
- Mladen Bestvina – major contributor to the field of geometric group theory, fellow of the American Mathematical Society, three-time medalist at the International Mathematical Olympiad, and visiting scholar at the Institute for Advanced Study
- Herbert Clemens – two-time invited speaker at the International Congress of Mathematicians, Sloan Fellow, visiting scholar at the Institute for Advanced Study, and proved that a cubic three-fold is in general not a rational variety
- Kenneth M. Golden – considered the "Indiana Jones of mathematics" for his work and expeditions to study polar sea ice, fellow of the Explorers Club, Society for Industrial and Applied Mathematics, and American Mathematical Society
- Christopher Hacon – fellow of the American Mathematical Society, received Cole Prize for work in higher dimensional birational geometry
- Roger Horn – co-developed the Bateman–Horn conjecture and co-wrote the standard-issue Matrix Analysis textbook with Charles Royal Johnson
- Fern Hunt – member of the Biological and Environmental Research Advisory Committee of the US Department of Energy and recipient of the Arthur S. Flemming Award for Outstanding Federal Service for her work in mathematical biology, stochastic modeling, and parallel computing
- James Keener – pioneer in the field of mathematical physiology and cardiology and SIAM fellow
- János Kollár – received Cole Prize for contributions to the minimal model program for threefolds in algebraic geometry
- Graeme Milton – received SIAM Ralph E. Kleinman Prize for contributions to the field of modeling composite materials, SIAM fellow, and Alfred P. Sloan Fellowship recipient
- Wiesława Nizioł – Invited Speaker at the 2006 International Congress of Mathematicians

=== Engineering and computer science ===
- Donald A. Dahlstrom – elected member of the National Academy of Engineering for his work on liquid-solids separation with the hydrocyclone
- David C. Evans – founder of the computer science department at the university; graphics pioneer and co-founder of Evans and Sutherland
- Alexandra Illmer Forsythe – author of the first computer science textbook
- Anthony C. Hearn – developed the REDUCE computer algebra system, co-founder of CSNET computer network
- John M. Hollerbach – editor of the International Journal of Robotics Research, co-founder of the International Symposium on Robotics Research, and co-inventor of the Utah/MIT dexterous hand
- Stephen Jacobsen – distinguished professor and founder of Sarcos, a robotics company that is now part of Raytheon
- Christopher R. Johnson – founding director of the Scientific Computing and Imaging Institute, recipient of the IEEE Computer Society Sidney Fernbach Award, and recipient of the Utah Governor's Medal for Science and Technology
- Steven Kistler – inventor of aerogels, the lightest known solid material
- Jan D. Miller – distinguished professor in metallurgical engineering holding over 30 patents on methods for processing oil sands, resin recovery from Utah coal, and air-sparged hydrocyclone technology
- Elliott Organick – educator considered "the foremost expositor writer of computer science"
- Suhas Patil – computer scientist; entrepreneur; founder of Cirrus Logic, a fabless semiconductor company
- John Regehr – developed the C compiler fuzzer Csmith, the Clang C compiler integer overflow sanitizer, and the blog Embedded in Academia
- Thomas Stockham – founder of Soundstream Inc., one of the experts selected to investigate President Richard Nixon's White House tapes
- Ivan Sutherland – winner of the Turing Award in 1988 for Sketchpad; co-founder of Evans and Sutherland
- Suresh Venkatasubramanian – developed the notion of t-closeness in differential privacy
- Anil Virkar – ISI Highly Cited researcher in ceramic engineering and fuel cells, Member of the National Academy of Inventors and the National Academy of Engineering

=== Medicine ===
- Balamurali Ambati – ophthalmologist, child prodigy who wrote a book on AIDS at age 11 and completed his MD at age 17
- Brenda L. Bass – distinguished professor of biochemistry focusing on RNA silencing, member of the National Academy of Sciences
- Mario Capecchi – 2007 Nobel laureate in Physiology or Medicine
- Susan Horn – pioneer in clinical biostatistics
- Janet Iwasa – data visualization designer for molecular processes
- Erik M. Jorgensen – lead researcher in the genetics field for finding more than 30 genes involved in synaptic function, Howard Hughes Medical Institute Investigator
- Willem Johan Kolff – pioneer of hemodialysis and in the field of artificial organs
- Jindřich Kopeček – distinguished professor of pharmaceutical chemistry and bioengineering and pioneer in drug delivery
- Kathi Mooney – distinguished professor of nursing
- Russell M. Nelson – physician and cardiothoracic surgeon; president of the LDS Church
- Richard A. Normann – distinguished professor of bioengineering, inventor of the Utah Electrode Array interface for studying parallel information processing in sensory corteces, and co-founder of the brain implant company Cyberkinetics which developed BrainGate
- John M. Opitz – developmental biologist who defined the concept of the developmental field in humans, and discovered and delineated Smith–Lemli–Opitz syndrome, Opitz–Kaveggia syndrome, Opitz G/BBB syndrome, Bohring–Opitz syndrome, and other autosomal and X-linked conditions
- Stefan M. Pulst – chairman of the Department of Neurology at the University of Utah; chair of the science committee of the American Academy of Neurology
- Wolfram Samlowski – oncologist; former director of the Translational Research, Multidisciplinary Melanoma Program at the Huntsman Cancer Institute
- Mark Skolnick – founder of Myriad Genetics
- Shuping Wang (1959–2019) – medical researcher associated to HIV in blood collection at Immunology and Pathology, Dermatology, Nephrology, Neurobiology, and Anatomy Labs
- Dixon M. Woodbury – epilepsy researcher, former chairman of the Department of Pharmacology and distinguished professor of Physiology and Pharmacology at the School of Medicine

=== Economics and political science ===
- Dean Baker (born 1958) – macroeconomist
- Russell W. Belk – professor of business administration and expert in art consumer and collector behavior
- Virginia Cutler – served on the White House Consumer Committee, as technical advisor in home economics education for the US International Cooperation Administration and the Point Four Program; dean of the home economics department; developed the home science program at the University of Ghana
- E. K. Hunt – emeritus professor of Economics; expert on political economy; author of History of Economic Thought: A Critical Perspective
- Minqi Li – political economist
- Patrick Shea – professor of political science, biology, and lawyer noted for taking on cases related to freedom of the press, represented the Massachusetts Democratic Party in seeking to gain enough information to exclude Mitt Romney from running for governor in Massachusetts, was included in Brent Jeffs's legal counsel in the sexual molestation suit against Warren Jeffs, chairman of the Utah Democratic Party, and served as national director of the Bureau of Land Management

=== Social and behavioral sciences ===
- Lisa M. Diamond – developmental psychologist noted for her work in sexual orientation development, sexual identity and bonding
- Ed Diener – social psychologist who pioneered the field of subjective well-being

=== Sports ===
- Greg Marsden – current coach of the women's gymnastics team coach marsden retired 2015
- Kyle Whittingham – former coach of the football team

=== Other ===
- Maud Babcock – first female member of the university's faculty
- E. Keith Eddington – artist and graphic designer
- Joseph F. Merrill – first native Utahn to receive a PhD, first principal of the College of Engineering, and creator of the LDS Institutes of Religion program
- Yehua Dennis Wei – professor of Geography

== See also ==
- University of Utah
- University of Utah College of Engineering
- University of Utah School of Medicine
- David Eccles School of Business
- S.J. Quinney College of Law
