= Adam Duncan =

Adam Duncan may refer to:

- Adam Duncan, 1st Viscount Duncan (1731–1804), British admiral
- Adam Haldane-Duncan, 2nd Earl of Camperdown (1812–1867), British politician
- Adam Duncan (sailor) (1833–?), sailor in the Union Navy in the American Civil War, recipient of the Medal of Honor
- Adam Duncan (cricketer) (1852–1940), English lawyer and cricketer
- Scott Duncan (footballer) (Adam Scott Mathieson Duncan, 1888–1975), Scottish footballer and manager
- Adam M. Duncan (1927–2000), member of the Utah state legislature
- Adam Lewis Duncan, American politician, member of the South Carolina House of Representatives
