= Girdhar Kumar Pandey =

Indian molecular biologist

- Born: 15 February 1972 (age 54); Almora, Uttarakhand, India
- Education: University of Delhi; Banaras Hindu University; Jawaharlal Nehru University; University of California at Berkeley
- Known for: Studies on the signal transduction pathways in Arabidopsis and Oryza sativa
- Awards: 1998 USDA FERRO Award; 2011 DBT-CREST Award; 2015 N-BIOS Prize
- Scientific career
- Fields: Molecular biology; Genomics; Biochemistry
- Workplaces: University of Delhi
- Doctoral advisor: Sudhir Kumar Sopory

Girdhar Kumar Pandey (born 15 February 1972) is an Indian molecular biologist, biochemist, biotechnologist, and a professor at the department of plant molecular biology of the South Campus of the University of Delhi. He is known for his studies on the signal transduction pathways in Arabidopsis (rockcress) and Oryza sativa (rice) and is an elected fellow of the National Academy of Sciences, India and the National Academy of Agricultural Sciences. The Department of Biotechnology of the Government of India awarded him the National Bioscience Award for Career Development, one of the highest Indian science awards, for his contributions to biosciences, in 2015.

== Biography ==
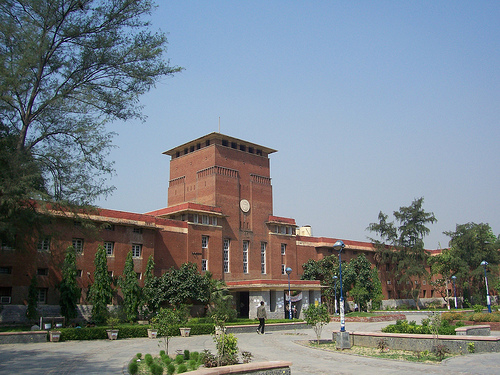
Delhi University

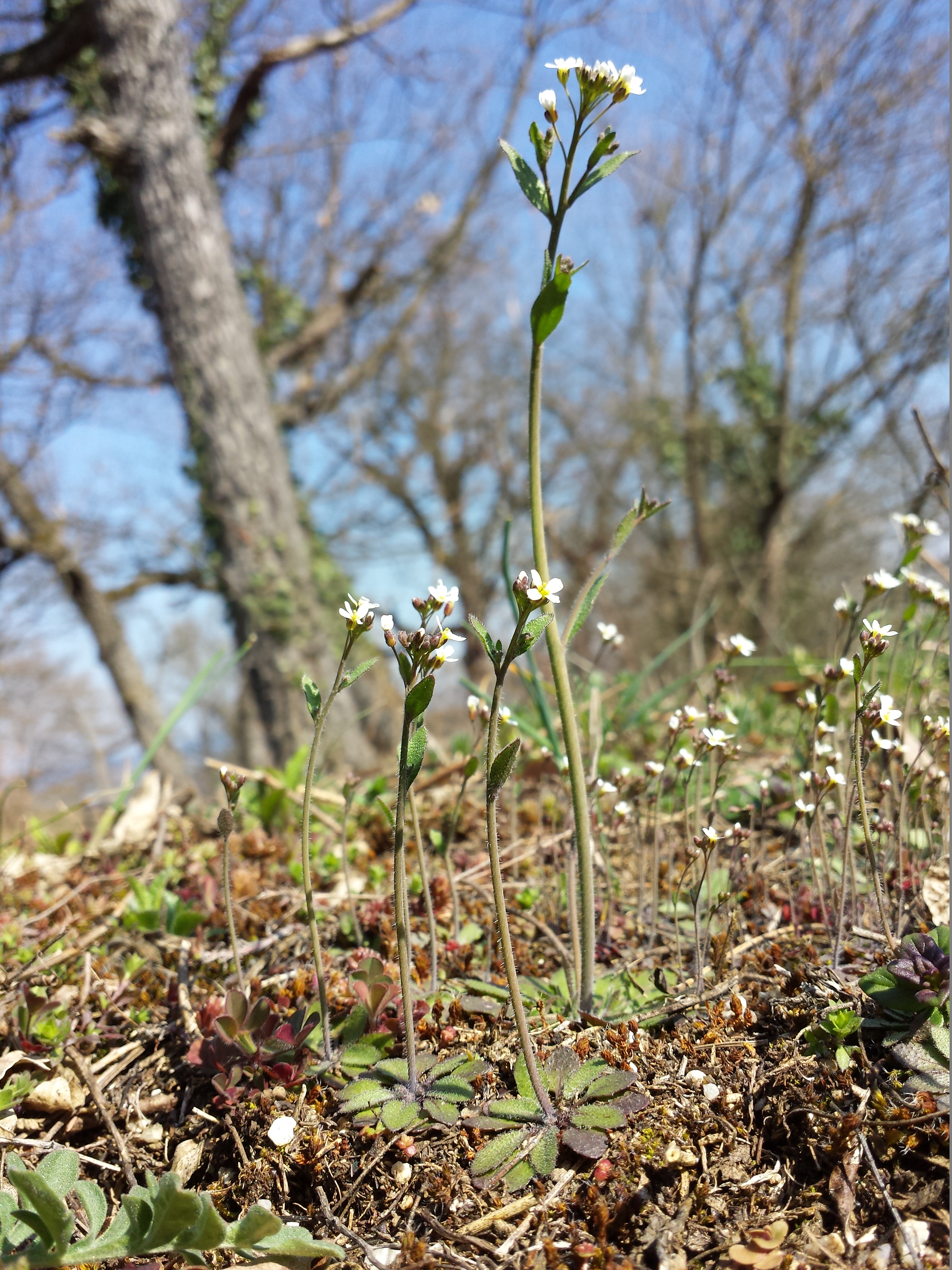
Rockcress

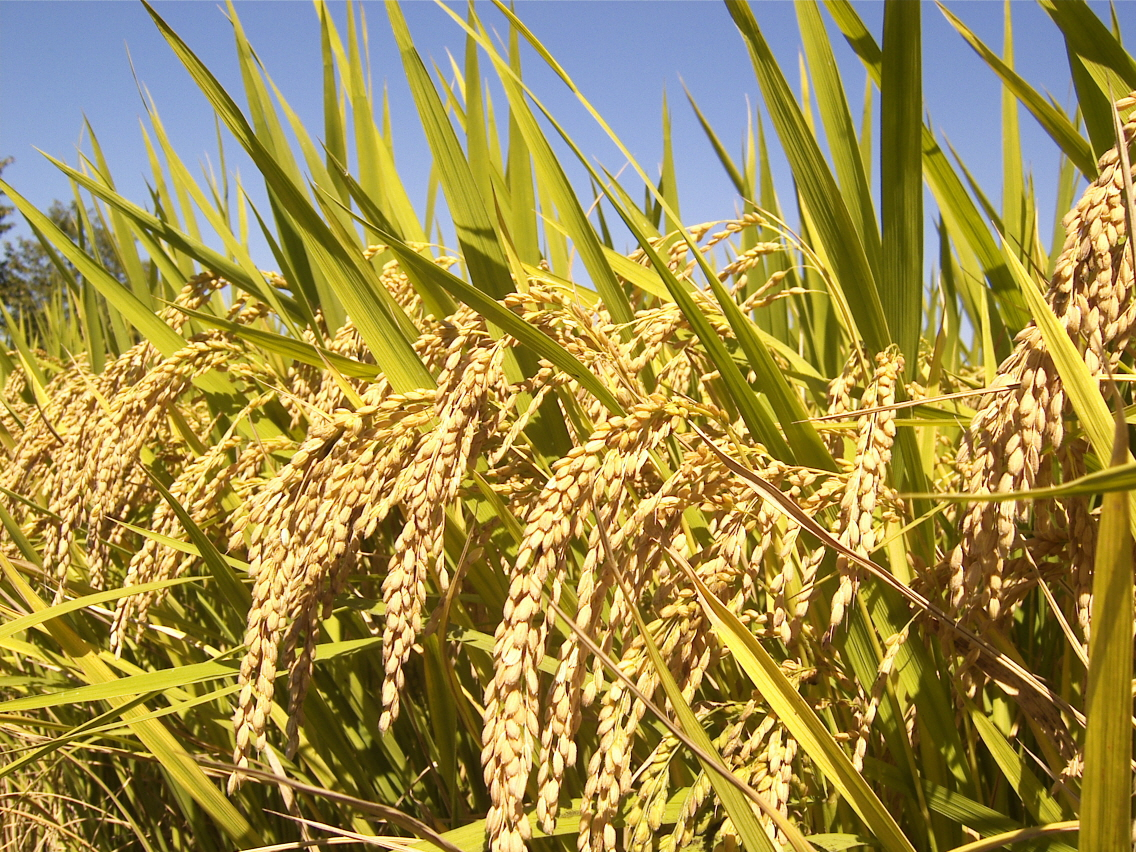
Rice plants

Girdhar Pandey was born on 15 February 1972 at Almora, in Uttarakhand to Kishan Chand and Kamala Devi Pandey. He completed his graduate studies in biochemistry from the University of Delhi in 1992 and moved to Banaras Hindu University for his post-graduate studies. After securing a master's degree in biotechnology in 1994, he returned to Delhi to pursue for his doctoral research under the guidance of Sudhir Kumar Sopory which earned him a PhD in 1999 from Jawaharlal Nehru University for his thesis, Presence and role of homologues of E. histolytica Calcium binding protein in higher plants and characterization of a novel protein kinase from Brassica juncea. His post-doctoral work was at the University of California, Berkeley under the supervision of Sheng Luan during 2000–07.

Pandey returned to India the same year to start his career by joining the University of Delhi at its south campus as a reader at the department of molecular biology and became a full professor in 2014. In between, he served as an associate professor from 2011 to 2014. He also served as a visiting professor at Capital Normal University, Beijing in 2012 and at the Institute of AgriBiotechnology of Jiangsu Academy of Agricultural Sciences in 2015.

Pandey is married to Amita Pandey who is working as a Scientist at Shriram Institute of Industrial Research, New Delhi and a co-author of some of his books. The family resides at Dwarka, Delhi.

== Professional profile ==
Pandey's research focuses on the mechanistic interplay of signal transduction networks in plants under mineral nutrient deficiency and abiotic stresses. The team has identified Arabidopsis (rockcress) and Oryza (rice) as the main focus of study. His studies have been documented by way of a number of articles (Note: Please see Selected bibliography section) and ResearchGate, an online repository of scientific articles has listed 148 of them. Besides, he has published 7 books, including The UNC-53-mediated Interactome: Analysis of its Role in the Generation of the C. elegans Connectome, GTPases: Versatile Regulators of Signal Transduction in Plants, Global Comparative Analysis of CBL-CIPK Gene Families in Plants, and Mechanism of Plant Hormone Signaling Under Stress - A Functional Genomic Frontier, a two-volume book published by Wiley-Blackwell in 2016 and has contributed chapters to books published by self and others. He is an academic editor of PLOS One (Note: Please see page 79) and an editor of Physiology and Molecular Biology of Plants. He sits in the editorial boards of journals such as Plant Signaling and Behaviour, Journal of Biological Sciences, Scientific Reports, Current Biotechnology, Current Genomics, and is an associate editor of Plant Molecular Biology Reporter and a former associate editor of Frontiers in Plant Science.

== Awards and honors ==
Pandey received the Far Eastern Regional Research Organization (FERRO) Award of the United States Department of Agriculture in 1998 and the DBT-CREST Award of the Department of Biotechnology in 2011. The Department of Biotechnology (DBT) of the Government of India awarded him the National Bioscience Award for Career Development, one of the highest Indian science awards in 2015. The National Academy of Sciences, India elected him as a fellow in 2016 and he became an elected fellow of the National Academy of Agricultural Sciences in 2018. In 2018, Indian Society for Plant Physiology, New Delhi has awarded him with J.J. Chinoy Gold Medal award.

== Selected bibliography ==
=== Books ===
- Girdhar K. Pandey (24 April 2017). Mechanism of Plant Hormone Signaling Under Stress, 2 Volume Set. John Wiley & Sons. ISBN 978-1-118-88892-6.
- Girdhar K. Pandey (24 April 2017). Mechanism of Plant Hormone Signaling Under Stress, 2 Volume Set. John Wiley & Sons. ISBN 978-1-118-88892-6.
- Girdhar K. Pandey; Manoj Prasad; Amita Pandey, Maik Boehmer (8 August 2016). Abiotic Stress Signaling in Plants: Functional Genomic Intervention. Frontiers Media SA. pp. 8–. ISBN 978-2-88919-891-7.
- Girdhar K. Pandey (30 May 2015). Elucidation of Abiotic Stress Signaling in Plants: Functional Genomics Perspectives. Springer. pp. 16–. ISBN 978-1-4939-2540-7.
- Girdhar K. Pandey; Manisha Sharma; Amita Pandey, Thiruvenkadam Shanmugam (14 November 2014). GTPases: Versatile Regulators of Signal Transduction in Plants. Springer. ISBN 978-3-319-11611-2.
- Girdhar K. Pandey; Poonam Kanwar; Amita Pandey (11 August 2014). Global Comparative Analysis of CBL-CIPK Gene Families in Plants. Springer. ISBN 978-3-319-09078-8.
- Amita Pandey; Girdhar K. Pandey (5 July 2014). The UNC-53-mediated Interactome: Analysis of its Role in the Generation of the C. elegans Connectome. Springer. pp. 1–. ISBN 978-3-319-07827-4.

=== Chapters ===
- Gyana Ranjan Rout; Anath Bandhu Das (12 February 2013). Molecular Stress Physiology of Plants. Springer Science & Business Media. pp. 241–. ISBN 978-81-322-0807-5.
- R.K. Gaur; Pradeep Sharma (2 December 2013). Approaches to Plant Stress and their Management. Springer Science & Business Media. pp. 53–. ISBN 978-81-322-1620-9.

=== Articles ===
- Cheong, Yong Hwa; Kim, Kyung-Nam; Pandey, Girdhar K.; Gupta, Rajeev; Grant, John J.; Luan, Sheng (1 August 2003). "CBL1, a Calcium Sensor That Differentially Regulates Salt, Drought, and Cold Responses in Arabidopsis". The Plant Cell. 15 (8): 1833–1845. doi:10.1105/tpc.012393. PMC 167173. PMID 12897256.
- Cheong, Yong Hwa; Pandey, Girdhar K.; Grant, John J.; Batistic, Oliver; Li, Legong; Kim, Beom-Gi; Lee, Sung-Chul; Kudla, Jörg; Luan, Sheng (21 August 2007). "Two calcineurin B-like calcium sensors, interacting with protein kinase CIPK23, regulate leaf transpiration and root potassium uptake in Arabidopsis". The Plant Journal. 52 (2): 223–239. doi:10.1111/j.1365-313x.2007.03236.x. PMID 17922773. S2CID 5032589.
- Pandey, Girdhar K.; Cheong, Yong Hwa; Kim, Kyung-Nam; Grant, John J.; Li, Legong; Hung, Wendy; D'Angelo, Cecilia; Weinl, Stefan; Kudla, Jörg (1 July 2004). "The Calcium Sensor Calcineurin B-Like 9 Modulates Abscisic Acid Sensitivity and Biosynthesis in Arabidopsis". The Plant Cell. 16 (7): 1912–1924. doi:10.1105/tpc.021311. PMC 514170. PMID 15208400.

== See also ==
- Protein kinase
- Genome
