= Image development =

Image development can refer to:

- Corporate image development – a process known as branding or positioning
- Imaging science – creating and developing images, mainly using signal processing methods
- Graphic image development – creating and developing graphic images, using visual art skills
  - Illustrating – developing and rendering graphic images
  - Photography – capturing and developing photographic images
  - Image editing – editing graphic images, in contrast to capturing or creating graphic images from scratch
  - 3-D modeling – creating and developing 3D computer generated graphic images from wireframe modeling
  - Handicraft – fabricating graphic images by hand
