= Current Genomics =

- Discipline: Genomics
- Language: English
- Edited by: Christian Néri

Publication details
- History: 2000–present
- Publisher: Bentham Science Publishers
- Frequency: 8/year
- Impact factor: 2.630 (2019)

Standard abbreviations
- ISO 4: Curr. Genom.
- NLM: Curr Genomics

Indexing
- CODEN: CMMUBP
- ISSN: 1389-2029 (print); 1875-5488 (web)
- OCLC no.: 47091629

Links
- Journal homepage; Online access; Online archive

Current Genomics is a peer-reviewed scientific journal covering all aspects of genomics. It was established in 2000 with Stefan M. Pulst as founding editor-in-chief and is published by Bentham Science Publishers. The editor-in-chief is Christian Néri (INSERM).

== Abstracting and indexing ==
The journal is abstracted and indexed in:

- BIOSIS Previews
- Chemical Abstracts Service
- Embase
- EMBiology
- Science Citation Index Expanded
- Scopus

According to the Journal Citation Reports, the journal has a 2019 impact factor of 2.630.
