= Amy Ashurst Gooch =

Canadian academic

Amy Gooch
- Education: University of Utah; Northwestern University
- Known for: Gooch shading
- Spouse: Bruce Gooch
- Scientific career
- Fields: Computer science
- Workplaces: Scientific Computing and Imaging Institute; University of Victoria; Texas A&M
- Thesis: Preserving Salience By Maintaining Perceptual Differences for Image Creation and Manipulation (2006)
- Doctoral advisor: Jack Tumblin

Amy Ashurst Gooch is an American computer scientist known for her contributions in non-photorealistic rendering. She is currently the Chief Operations Officer at ViSOAR LLC, a data visualization research spin-off software company from the Scientific Computing and Imaging Institute. She is also an adjunct professor of computer science at Texas A&M University. Her current research is part of an interdisciplinary effort involving computer graphics, perceptual psychology, and computational vision. She is interested in better understanding the spatial information potentially available in CG imagery, determining what spatial cues are actually used when CG imagery is viewed, and using this information to create improved rendering algorithms and visualizations.

== Biography ==
Gooch earned her BS in Computer Engineering in 1996 and her MS in Computer Science in 1998 from the University of Utah. While working on her master's degree, she explored interactive non-photorealistic technical illustration as a new rendering paradigm and developed Gooch shading, which she presented at the 1998 SIGGRAPH conference. Following her masters, she worked at the University of Utah as a research scientist for five years. During this time, she co-taught a course at the 1999 SIGGRAPH conference on non-photorealistic rendering and co-authored the first textbook in the field, Non-Photorealistic Rendering, with her husband Bruce Gooch. In 2004, she began her PhD in computer science at Northwestern University and graduated in 2006. Following her PhD, she joined the faculty at the University of Victoria in British Columbia as an assistant professor of computer science. In 2013, she joined the Scientific Computing and Imaging Institute to help develop the ViSUS software core into a product. In 2014, she became an adjunct professor of computer science at Texas A&M University.

== Works ==
- Bruce Gooch, Amy Ashurst Gooch, Non-Photorealistic Rendering, AK Peters, July 2001, ISBN 978-1-56881-133-8

== See also ==
- Gooch shading
- Scientific Computing and Imaging Institute
