= Darron Smith =

African American scholar, author and blogger

Darron T. Smith
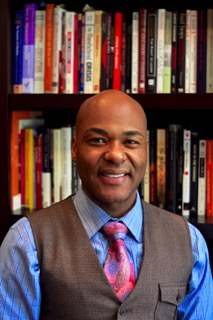
- Occupation(s): Scholar, clinician, educator, author and blogger

Academic background
- Education: Brigham Young University–Idaho; Brigham Young University (MEd); University of Utah (PhD)

Academic work
- Discipline: Healthcare, sociology, race-based trauma, neurosociology, psychedelic healing
- Sub-discipline: neurosociology, applied neurosciencee
- Notable works: Black and Mormon; White Parents, Black Children; When Race, Religion, and Sports Collide

Darron Smith is an African-American scholar, author and blogger. His research and scholarly writing focuses on social injustices impacting African Americans and other marginalized groups in the US. His work includes the study and impact of race on US health care, the practice of white parents adopting black and biracial children, religion, sports, politics and other pertinent subject matters of present time.

Smith's most known work is the 2004 book, Black and Mormon, a book-length anthology exploring black Mormons and their place in the Church of Jesus Christ of Latter-day Saints (LDS Church) since the 1978 priesthood revelation that lifted the ban on blacks holding priesthood in the church. His most recent book, When Race, Religion and Sport Collide: Black athletes at BYU and Beyond, explores African American male student-athletes through the medium of sport in the era of the Black Lives Matter movement.

== Early life and education ==
Smith was born in Nashville, Tennessee, but his formative years were split between Los Angeles and Nashville. As a child, he followed the Baptist faith along with his family. As a teenager, however, Smith began to question his faith. When he was 15, he met a black member of the LDS Church who briefly introduced him to Mormonism. A short time later, Smith had an unrelated encounter when two Mormon missionaries came to the Smith residence and further broadened his understanding of the religion. He felt that his questions about religion were better answered through Mormonism. Smith converted from the Baptist faith to Mormonism in 1981. He later went on to serve a mission for the LDS Church in Lansing, Michigan.

After graduating from Antioch High School in Nashville, he began his collegiate studies at the LDS Church-owned BYU-Idaho (formerly known as Ricks College). During his time at Ricks, Smith served one year in the regular Army, training as an Army photographer. He later transferred his undergraduate training to the University of Utah in Salt Lake City where he completed his bachelor's degree in Behavioral Science and Health in 1994.

== Career and further education ==
Smith completed the physician assistant training program from the University of Utah School of Medicine in 1996. In the late 1990s, he started teaching college students. While continuing to practice as a certified PA, Smith taught courses at universities in and around the Salt Lake valley, including Brigham Young University, Utah Valley University and the University of Utah. It was while working as a PA student at the BYU Sports Medicine facility in Provo, Utah, that he enrolled in the Masters of Educational Leadership at the BYU. He completed his M.Ed. in 2000. Two years later, he enrolled in the University of Utah's Education, Culture, and Society doctoral program. Smith continued to teach at BYU until 2006, when his contract was not renewed allegedly over his manuscript, Black and Mormon.

In May 2010, Smith received his Ph.D. from University of Utah. The winter, he joined the faculty at Wichita State University as an assistant professor in the Physician Assistant Program. He left Wichita State University in mid 2012 and pursued his work on When Race, Religion and Sport Collide. By April 2013, he relocated to Memphis, Tennessee to join the staff at The University of Tennessee Health Science Center as an assistant professor and later taught in the Department of Sociology at the University of Memphis.Smith is currently teaching at the University of Washington in the Department of Family Medicine where he teaches future generations of healthcare providers.

Smith's research focus includes issues of social inequality, stress, racism, discrimination, income inequality, disparities in higher education and health-related inequalities that African Americans endure. He studies and writes about the emotional toll of being a racialized minority in a white supremacist nation and the impact it has on physical and mental well-being. This work also focuses on psychedelic assisted facilitation for BIPOC suffering from race-based trauma and stress. His articles have been featured in numerous academic journals. Additionally, his work has appeared in Adoption Today, Religion Dispatches, Deadspin, and Your Black World, and he also published op-ed pieces in The New York Times and the Chicago Tribune. He is a regular blogger for Huffington Post, where he uses social media as a platform to advocate for social change. He has written widely from urban street culture to pop culture. Smith's most successful post explored the appropriation of black music by Justin Bieber's rise to stardom. Smith has also written about the Ferguson Riots, which began shortly after the death of Michael Brown that sparked a national outcry against police brutality against young unarmed black men and woman.

== Books ==
Smith co-edited the book, Black and Mormon, a book-length anthology exploring black Mormons and their place in the LDS Church since the 1978 priesthood revelation. It was published in 2004. The book received positive reviews. Publishers Weekly wrote that it is "one of the most far-reaching studies of black Mormons to date" and that it is "an outstanding series of essays on the problems of racism among the Mormons and the exclusion of African American men from the priesthood of the Church of Jesus Christ of Latter-day Saints."

He co-authored the 2011 book, White Parents, Black Children: Experiencing Transracial Adoption that explains the issue of race in transracial adoptions—particularly the adoption of black and biracial children by white adopting parents. The book argues that racism remains a significant problem for transracial adoptees. Choice Magazine recommended the book and called it "an important read for all parents, practitioners, and pundits in the field [of adoption]." Social Forces wrote that "... the book will surely serve as a valuable resource for parents to help them understand that when forming a family across the color line, love is not enough."

In 2016, he wrote When Race, Religion, and Sports Collide: Black Athletes at BYU and Beyond to critical acclaim. The book tells the story of Brandon Davies' dismissal from Brigham Young University's NCAA playoff basketball team. It illustrates the intersection of sport, race and religion at BYU. Smith also examines athlete's dismissed through honor code violations at BYU, indicating that they are mostly African American. While reviewing the book on Mormon Stories, John Dehlin wrote that "I want to highlight this amazing book . . . [It] is a really fascinating read . . . I can't plug this book enough and tell everybody they need to read it." Choice Magazine reviewed the book and wrote that "Arguing that the close and complex relationship between race and religion can be uncovered through sports, Smith does a masterful job of weaving together critical race theory, US religious history, and sports to examine institutionalized racism in intercollegiate athletics."

== Bibliography ==
- Black and Mormon. (2006). ISBN 978-0252073564
- White Parents, Black Children: Experiencing Transracial Adoption. (2011). ISBN 978-1442207622
- Social Inequality and Social Justice in Medicine. (2012). ISBN 978-1-6213-1019-8
- When Race, Religion, and Sports Collide: Black Athletes at BYU and Beyond. (2016). ISBN 978-1-4422-1789-8
