= Richard H. Boyd =

American chemist

Richard Hays Boyd (August 12, 1929 – December 28, 2016) was an American chemist. He was a distinguished professor at the University of Utah, and he was named a fellow of the American Physical Society in 1980.

Boyd died from Alzheimer's disease on December 28, 2016, at the age of 87.
