= Adam Duncan (cricketer) =

Indian-born English lawyer and cricketer

Personal information
- Full name: Adam Seymour Dickson Duncan
- Born: 8 June 1852; Calcutta, Bengal, India
- Died: 21 February 1940 (aged 87); Hatfield, Hertfordshire, England
- Batting: Unknown
- Bowling: Unknown

Domestic team information
- Years: Team
- 1875: Cambridge University
- 1873–1879: Marylebone Cricket Club

Career statistics
Competition	First-class
Matches	14
Runs scored	313
Batting average	13.60
100s/50s	0/0
Top score	42
Catches/stumpings	5/–
- Source: Cricket Archive, 25 April 2020

Adam Seymour Dickson Duncan (8 June 1852 – 21 February 1940) was an Indian-born English lawyer and a first-class cricketer who played in fourteen matches, mainly for Marylebone Cricket Club (MCC), between 1873 and 1879. He was born in Calcutta, Bengal.

Duncan was educated at Eton College and at Trinity Hall, Cambridge. Although he played as a batsman in a few school cricket matches, he did not appear in the Eton v Harrow games. In his first year at Cambridge University in 1873 he was picked for trial games, but did not earn a game for the first eleven, although he played in a first-class match against the Cambridge side for "An England XI", when he scored 19 and 0. Playing for a scratch amateur team against a university side was a frequent ploy used by the university cricket teams in both the 19th and early 20th centuries to give a further trial to a potentially promising player; Duncan went through the same rigmarole two years later in 1875, again selected for "An England XI", but this time with 36 in the only England innings he was the top-scorer (W. G. Grace made 24). That led to selection for two Cambridge University matches, but after scoring 33 in his first innings for the university he had a poor second game and was not picked again. His remaining first-class cricket was a series of matches for the MCC, five of them in 1879, and the last of which included his highest first-class score, 42, made against Lancashire.

Duncan graduated from Cambridge University with a Bachelor of Arts degree in 1876; he became a solicitor, practising from Queen Victoria Street, London.

He died in Hatfield, Hertfordshire on 21 February 1940, aged 87.
