= Sarah Projansky =

American academic

Sarah Projansky is Associate Vice President for Faculty at the University of Utah in Salt Lake City, Utah. From 2008 to 2020 she was Professor of Film & Media Arts and of Gender Studies, and Adjunct Professor of Communication. She's also an author of a number of books including Spectacular Girls and Watching Rape.
