= Gooch shading =

Non-photorealistic rendering technique

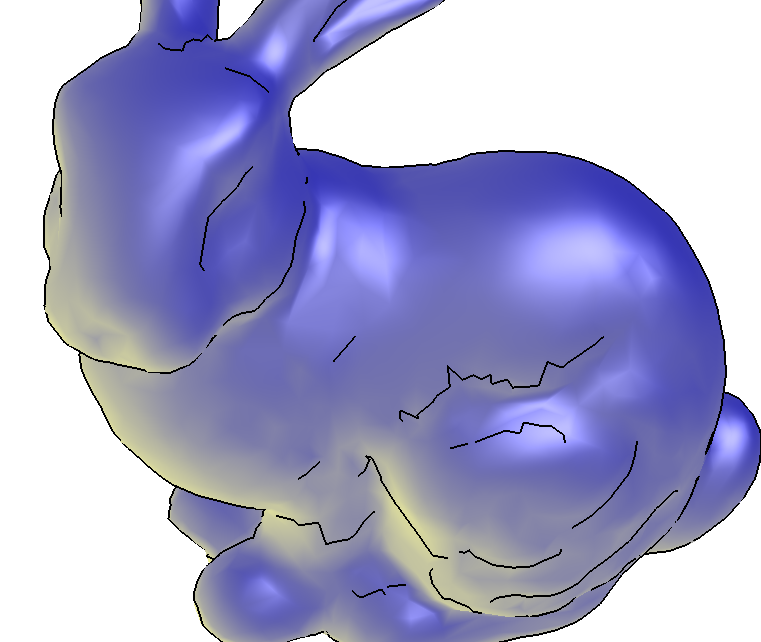
An example of gooch shading on the Stanford bunny

graphics complex of a seashell with gooch shading modeled in Mathematica 13.1

Gooch shading is a non-photorealistic rendering technique for shading objects. It is also known as "cool to warm" shading, and is widely used in technical illustration.

== History ==
Gooch shading was developed by Amy Gooch et al. at the University of Utah School of Computing and first presented at the 1998 SIGGRAPH conference. It has since been implemented in shader libraries, software, and games released by Autodesk, Nvidia, and Valve.

== Process ==
Gooch shading defines an additional two colors in conjunction with the original model color: a warm color (such as yellow) and a cool color (such as blue). The warm color indicates surfaces that are facing toward the light source while the cool color indicates surfaces facing away. This allows shading to occur only in mid-tones so that edge lines and highlights remain visually prominent. The Gooch shader is typically implemented in two passes: all objects in the scene are first drawn with the "cool to warm" shading, and in the second pass the object's edges are rendered in black.

== See also ==
- List of common shading algorithms
- Phong shading
- Cel shading
- Non-photorealistic rendering
