= Csmith =

Test case generation tool

- Original authors: Xuejun Yang, Yang Chen, Eric Eide, John Regehr
- Release: 2011; 15 years ago
- Stable release: 2.3.0 / June 21, 2017; 9 years ago
- Written in: C++, Perl
- Type: Compiler fuzzer
- License: BSD license
- Website: embed.cs.utah.edu/csmith/
- Repository: github.com/csmith-project/csmith/

Csmith is a test case generation tool. It can generate random C programs that statically and dynamically conform to the C99 standard. It is used for stress-testing compilers, static analyzers, and other tools that process C code. It is a free, open source, permissively licensed C compiler fuzzer developed by researchers at the University of Utah. It was previously called Randprog.
