= Yehua Dennis Wei =

Chinese-American geographer (born 1963)

Yehua Dennis Wei (Chinese: 魏也华, born in Zhejiang, China in 1963) is a Chinese-American geographer. He is a professor in the School of Environment, Society and Sustainability at the University of Utah. His research has been funded by the NSF, NIH, Lincoln Institute of Land Policy, National Geographic Society, Ford Foundation and Natural Science Foundation of China (NSFC). He has received awards for research excellence from the American Association of American Geographers' (AAG) and the NSFC (Outstanding Young Scientist Award). He is an editor-in-chief of Applied Geography.

== Education and career ==
- B.S. Economic Geography and Urban Planning, Hangzhou (Zhejiang) University, 1984
- M.S. Human Geography, Nanjing Institute of Geography, Chinese Academy of Science, 1987
- M.A. Urban Studies, University of Akron, 1991
- M.A. Geography, University of Akron, 1993
- Ph.D. Geography, University of California at Los Angeles, 1998
- Assistant Professor, Department of Geography and Urban Studies Program, University of Wisconsin-Milwaukee, 1997-2002
- Associate Professor, Department of Geography and Urban Studies Program, University of Wisconsin-Milwaukee, 2002-2007
- Professor, Department of Geography and Institute of Public and International Affairs, University of Utah, 2007–2024
- Professor, School of Environment, Society and Sustainability, University of Utah, 2024–Present

== Awards and honors ==
- Excellence in Research Award. Graduate School/University of Wisconsin-Milwaukee Foundation Award in Recognition of Excellence in Research, 2003
- Overseas Outstanding Young Scientist Award, Natural Science Foundation of China (NSFC), Beijing, 2004
- Distinguished Scholar Award, Regional Development and Planning Specialty Group, Association of American Geographers(AAG), Chicago, 2006
- Distinguished Service Award, Asian Geography Specialty Group, Association of American Geographers (AAG), Las Vegas, 2009
- Distinguished Service Award, Regional Development and Planning Specialty Group, Association of American Geographers (AAG), Las Vegas, 2009
- Outstanding Service Award, China Geography Specialty Group, Association of American Geographers (AAG), Seattle, 2011
- International Fellow, Lincoln Institute of Land Policy, 2011, 2013
- Overseas and Hong Kong-Macao Scholars Collaboration Award, Natural Science Foundation of China (formally Overseas Outstanding Young Scientist Award), 2011 (First Stage), 2013 (Second Stage)
- Overseas Evaluation Expert, the Chinese Academy of Sciences, 2016
- Highly Cited Researcher Award, Clarivate/Web of Science, 2024
- Fellow, American Association of Geographers, 2024–Present

== Selected publications ==
=== Books and edited volumes ===
- Wei, Y.D. 2000. Regional Development in China: States, Globalization, and Inequality. Routledge. ISBN 978-0-415-22448-2.
- Lin, G.C.S. and Y.D. Wei (eds.). 2002. Special Issue on China's Restless Urban Landscapes I. Environment and Planning A 34(9): 1535-1660.
- Wei, Y.D. and G.C.S. Lin (eds.). 2002. Special Issue on China's Restless Urban Landscapes II. Environment and Planning A 34(10): 1721-1831.
- Weng, Q. and Y.D. Wei (eds.). 2003. Special Issue on Land Use and Land Cover Change in China. Asian Geographer 22(1-2): 1-142.
- Zhou, Y. and Y.D. Wei (eds.). 2011. Special Issue on Globalization, Innovation and Regional Development in China. Environment and Planning A 43(4): 781-849.
- Liefner, I. and Y.D. Wei (eds.). 2011. Special Issue on Globalization, Innovation, and Development. Erdkunde 65(1): 3-83.
- Wei, Y.D. and I. Liefner (eds.). 2012. Special Issue on Globalization, Industrial Restructuring, and Regional Development in China. Applied Geography 32(1): 102-184.
- Liefner, I. and Y.D. Wei (eds.). 2014. Innovation and Regional Development in China. London and New York: Routledge.
- Wei, Y.D. (ed.). 2015. Spatial Inequality. Applied Geography 61: 1-116.
- We, Y.D. (ed.) 2017. Urban Land and Sustainable Development. Basel, Switzerland: MDPI.
- Wei, Y.D. (ed.). 2017. Geography of Inequality in Asia. Geographical Review 107(2): 263-411.
- Wei, Y.D. and R. Ewing (eds.). 2018. Urban Expansion, Sprawl and Inequality. Landscape and Urban Planning 177: 259-361.
- Wei, Y.D. and J. Nijman (eds.). 2020. Urban Inequality. Applied Geography 115.
- Liao, F.H., Y.D. Wei and L. Huang. 2021. Regional Inequality in Transitional China. London: Routledge.

=== Selected journal articles ===
- Wei, Y.D. 1999. "Regional Inequality in China." Progress in Human Geography 23(1): 49-59.
- Wei, Y.D. and C.C. Fan. 2000. "Regional Inequality in China: A Case Study of Jiangsu Province." Professional Geographer 52(3): 455-469.
- Wei, Y.D. and S. Kim. 2002. "Widening Intercounty Inequality in Jiangsu Province, China,1950-1995." Journal of Development Studies 38(6): 142-164.
- Wei, Y.D. 2002. "Beyond the Sunan Model: Trajectory and Underlying Factors of Development in Kunshan, China." Environment and Planning A 34(10): 1725-1747.
- Wei, Y.D. 2005. "Planning Chinese Cities: The Limits of Transitional Institutions." Urban Geography 26(3): 200-221.
- Wei, Y.D. 2006. "Geographers and Globalization: The Future of Regional Geography." Environment and Planning A 38(8): 1395-1400.
- Yu, D.L., Y.D. Wei and C.S. Wu. 2007. "Modeling Spatial Dimensions of Housing Prices in Milwaukee, WI." Environment and Planning B 34(6): 1085-1102.
- Wei, Y.D., C.K. Leung and W.M. Li. 2008. "Institutions, Location, and Network of Multinational Enterprises in China." Urban Geography 29(7): 639-661.
- He, C., Y.D. Wei and X. Xie. 2008. "Globalization, Institutional Change, and Industrial Location: Economic Transition and Industrial Concentration in China." Regional Studies 42(7): 923-945.
- Luo, J. and Y.D. Wei. 2009. "Modeling Spatial Variations of Urban Growth Patterns in Chinese Cities." Landscape and Urban Planning 91(2): 51-64.
- Wei, Y.D., Y.Q. Lu and W. Chen. 2009. "Globalizing Regional Development in Sunan, China: Does Suzhou Industrial Park Fit a Neo-Marshallian District Model?" Regional Studies 43(3): 409-427.
- Wei, Y.D. 2010. "Beyond New Regionalism, Beyond Global Production Networks: Remaking the Sunan Model, China." Environment and Planning C: Government and Policy 28(1): 72-96.
- Wei, Y.D. and C.L. Gu. 2010. "A Study of Industrial Development and Spatial Structure in Changzhou City, China: The Restructuring of the Sunan Model." Urban Geography 31(3): 321-347.
- Li, Y.R. and Y.D. Wei. 2010. "The Spatial-Temporal Hierarchy of Regional Inequality of China." Applied Geography 30: 303-316.
- Wei, Y.D. and J. Luo and Q. Zhou. 2010. "Location Decisions and Network Configurations of Foreign Investment in Urban China." Professional Geographer 62(2): 264-283.
- Wei, Y.D., J. Li and Y.M. Ning. 2010. "Corporate Networks, Value Chains, and Spatial Organization: A Study of the Computer Industry in China." Urban Geography 31(8): 1118-1140.
- Zhou, Y., Y.F. Sun, Y.D. Wei and G.C.S. Lin. 2011. "De-centering 'Spatial Fix'—Patterns of Territorialization and Regional Technological Dynamism of ICT Hubs in China." Journal of Economic Geography 11(1): 119-150.
- Wei, Y.D., I. Liefner, and C.H. Miao. 2011. "Network Configurations and R&D Activities of the ICT Industry in Suzhou Municipality, China." Geoforum 42(4): 484-495.
- Wei, Y.D., Y. Zhou, Y.F. Sun, and G.C.S. Lin. 2012. "Production and R&D Networks of Foreign Ventures in China." Applied Geography 32(1): 106-118.
- Wei, Y.D., F. Yuan and F.H. Liao. 2013. Spatial Mismatch and Determinants of Foreign and Domestic ICT Firms in China. Professional Geographer 65(2): 247-264.
- Sun, Y.F., Y. Zhou, G.C.S. Lin and Y.D. Wei. 2013. Subcontracting and Supplier Technology Upgrading. Regional Studies 47(10): 1766-1784.
- Wei, Y.D. and X.Y. Ye. 2014. Urbanization, Urban Land Expansion, and Environmental Change in China. Stochastic Environmental Research and Risk Assessment 28(4): 757-765.
- Huang, H. and Y.D. Wei. 2014. Intra-metropolitan Location of Foreign Direct Investment in Wuhan, China. Applied Geography 47: 78-88.
- Wei, Y.D. 2015. Network Linkages and Local Embeddedness of Foreign Ventures in China. Regional Studies 49(2): 287-299.
- Wei, Y.D. 2015. Spatiality of Regional Inequality. Applied Geography 61: 1-10.
- Wei, Y.D., X. Bi and Y. Ning. 2016. Globalization, Economic Restructuring and Locational Trajectories of Software Firms in Shanghai. Professional Geographer 68(2): 211-226.
- Ewing, R., S. Hamidi, J.B. Grace and Y.D. Wei. 2016. Does Urban Sprawl Hold Down Upward Mobility? Landscape and Urban Planning 148: 80-88.
- Wei, Y.D., H. Li and W. Yue. 2017. Urban land expansion and regional inequality in Transitional China. Landscape and Urban Planning 163: 17-31.
- Shen, J., Y.D. Wei and Z. Yang. 2017. The impact of environmental regulations on the location of pollution-intensive industries in China. Journal of Cleaner Production 148: 785-794.
- Wei, Y.D., W. Xiao, C.A. Simon, B. Liu and Y. Ni. 2018. Neighborhood, race and education inequality. Cities 73: 1-13.
- Wei, Y.D. and R. Ewing. 2018. Urban expansion, sprawl and inequality. Landscape and Urban Planning 177: 259-265.
- Li, H., Y.D. Wei, Y. Wu and G. Tian. 2019. Analyzing housing prices in Shanghai with open data. Cities 91: 165-179.
- Li, H. Y.D. Wei ad Y. Wu. 2019. Analyzing the private rental housing market in Shanghai with open data. Land Use Policy 85: 271-284.
- Li, H., Y. Zhou ad Y.D. Wei. 2019. Institutions, extreme weather and urbanization in the Greater Mekong Region. Annals of AAG 109(4): 1317-1340.
- Huang, H. and Y.D. Wei. 2019. The Spatial-temporal hierarchy of inequality in urban China. Professional Geographer 71(3): 391-407.
- Yuan F., Y.D. Wei, W. Xiao. 2019. Land marketization, fiscal decentralization, and the dynamics of urban land prices in transitional China. Land Use Policy 89: 104209.
- Wu, J., Z. Yu, Y.D. Wei and L. Yang. 2019. Changing distribution of the floating population and its determinants in urban China. Habitat International 94: 102063.
- Wei, Y.D., Y. Wu, F.H. Liao and L. Zhang. Regional inequality, spatial polarization and place mobility in provincial China. Applied Geography 124: 102296.
- Wu, Y., Y.D. Wei and H. Li. 2020. Firm suburbanization in the context of urban sprawl. Professional Geographer 72(4): 598-617.
- Wei, Y.D., J. Lin and L. Zhang. 2020. E-commerce, Taobao villages and regional development in China. Geographical Review 110(3): 380-405.
- Wu, C., X. Huang, Y.D. Wei, B. Chen and X. Chuai. 2020. Valuing land use change effects upon ecosystem service values:. Ecological Indicator 117: 106507.
- Nijman, J. and Y.D. Wei. 2020. Urban inequalities in the 21st century economy. Applied Geography 117: 102188.
- Li, H. and Y.D. Wei. 2020. Spatial inequality of housing value changes since the financial crisis. Applied Geography 115: 102141.
- Li, H., Y.D. Wei and E. Swerts. 2020. Spatial Clustering and Inequality of City-Regions in the Yangtze River Valley, China. Urban Studies 57(3): 672-689.
- Yuan, F., Y.D. Wei and J. Wu. 2020. Amenity Effects of Urban Facilities on Housing Prices in China: Accessibility, Scarcity, and Urban Spaces. Cities 96: 102433.
- Wang, J., Y.D. Wei and B. Lin. 2021. Functional division and the determinants of location choice for Chinese OFDI. Environment and Planning A 53(5): 937-957.
- Liu, W., J. Shen, Y.D. Wei and W. Chen. 2021. Environmental injustice in China. Journal of Cleaner Production 317: 128334.
- Wei, Y.D., W. Xiao, R. Medina and G. Tian. 2021. Effects of neighborhood environment, safety, and urban amenities on origins and destinations of walking Behavior. Urban Geography 42(2): 120-140
- Xiao, W., Y.D. Wei and H. Li. 2021. Spatial inequality of job accessibility in Shanghai: A geographical skills mismatch perspective. Habitat International 115: 102401.
- Wei, Y.D., W. Xiao and Y. Wu. 2021. Trip generation, trip chains and polycentric development in metropolitan USA: A case study of the Wasatch Front, Utah. Applied Geography 133: 102488.
- McCullough, M., N. Wan, M. Pezzolesi, T. Collins, S.E. Grineski, Y.D. Wei, J. Lazaro-guevara, S. Frodsham, J. Vanderslice, J. Holmen, T. Srinivas, S. Clements. 2021. Type 1 Diabetes Incidence Among Youth in Utah: A Geographical Analysis. Social Science and Medicine 278: 113952.
- Xiao, W., Y.D. Wei and N. Wang. 2021. Modeling job accessibility using online map data. Journal of Transport Geography 93: 103065.
- Xiao, W., Y.D. Wei and Y. Wu. 2022. The resilience of public transit system against COVID-19. Transportation Research D 110:

103428.

- Wang, Y., Y.D. Wei and D. Sun. 2022. New city and national city size distribution. Habitat International 127: 102632.
- Ma, H., Y.D. Wei, X. Huang and X. Xu. 2022. The innovation networks of large enterprises in urban China. Environment and Planning A 54(7): 1432-1449.
- An, Y., Y.D. Wei, F. Yuan and W. Chen. 2022. Impacts of high-speed rails on urban networks and regional development. International Journal of Sustainable Transportation 16(6): 483-495.
- Zhang, W., B. Wang, Q. Wu and Y.D. Wei. How does industrial agglomeration affect urban land use efficiency? Land Use Policy 119: 106178.
- Wu, Y., Y.D. Wei, H. Li and M. Liu. 2022. Amenity, firm distribution, and urban creativity: A study of producer services in Shanghai, China. Cities 120: 103421.

== Selected grants ==
- Collaborative Research: Business Organization and Network Relations of Foreign Manufacturing Ventures in the Yangtze Delta Region, China. NSF, 2001-2005. PI (with C. K. Leung).
- Local Capitalism in China: An Institutional and Network Analysis of Private Enterprises in Wenzhou, Zhejiang Province. National Geographic Society, 2004-2005. PI.
- Globalization and Regional Development in the Yangtze Delta, China. Natural Science Foundation of China, 2005-2007. PI.
- A Comparative Study of ICT Industry Development in the Beijing, Shanghai-Suzhou, and Shenzhen-Dongguan City Regions in China. NSF, 2006-2009. PI (with Y. Zhou and Y. Sun).
- Remaking the Sunan Model, China. National Geographic Society, 2008-2009. PI.
- Remaking Development Models in China: Globalization, the State, and Regional Development. Ford Foundation, 2008-2011. PI.
- Urban Land Expansion and Spatial Restructuring in the Yangtze River Delta, China. Lincoln Institute of Land Policy, 2011
- A Spatial-Temporal Analysis of Intraprovincial Inequality in China. The National Natural Science Foundation of China (Overseas and Hong Kong-Macao Scholars Collaboration Fund, 2011-2017. PI.
- Economic Transition, Urbanization and Spatial Inequality in China. Ford Foundation, 2015-2018. PI.
- Reducing VMT, Encouraging Walk Trips, and Facilitating Efficient Trip Chains through Polycentric Development. National Institute for Transportation & Communities, 2018-2019. Co-PI.
- Urban Housing and Land and Their Implications for Inequality under the Process of Urbanization in China. Ford Foundation, 2018-2022.PI
- Comparative Regional Inequality Dynamics, NSF, 2018-2023. Co-PI.
- Area-level Socio-economic Conditions and Individual-level Health and Mortality: Exploring Place-Based Mechanisms and Individual-level Psychosocial Processes. National Institute of Health (NIH), 2023-2027. Co-I.
