= Xuejun Wen =

Chinese bioengineer

Xuejun Wen is a bioengineer and the William H. Goodwin Professor, Department of Chemical and Life Science Engineering, Institute for Engineering and Medicine, Virginia Commonwealth University.

== Early life and education ==
Wen was born in May 1971 at Linzhou City, Henan Province, P.R. China. He earned an M.D. at Henan Medical University (now part of Zhengzhou University) in 1994. He earned an M.S. in materials science and engineering from Zhejiang University in 1997. Subsequently he moved to the United States and in 2000 earned a second M.S. in materials science and engineering at the University of Cincinnati. He earned a PhD in bioengineering from University of Utah in 2003.

== Career ==
He was appointed to a faculty position in the Department of Bioengineering in Clemson University. He then was recruited to start the joint Bioengineering Program between Clemson University and Medical University of South Carolina. In 2010, he was promoted to full professor and also became the first holder of Hansjörg Wyss Endowed Chair Professor in Regenerative Medicine.

In 2012, he accepted a position at Virginia Commonwealth University, where his research focuses on biomaterials, and cell and tissue engineering.

He became a Fellow of the American Institute for Medical and Biological Engineering in 2012.
