= Talmage Egan =

American academic

Talmage D. Egan
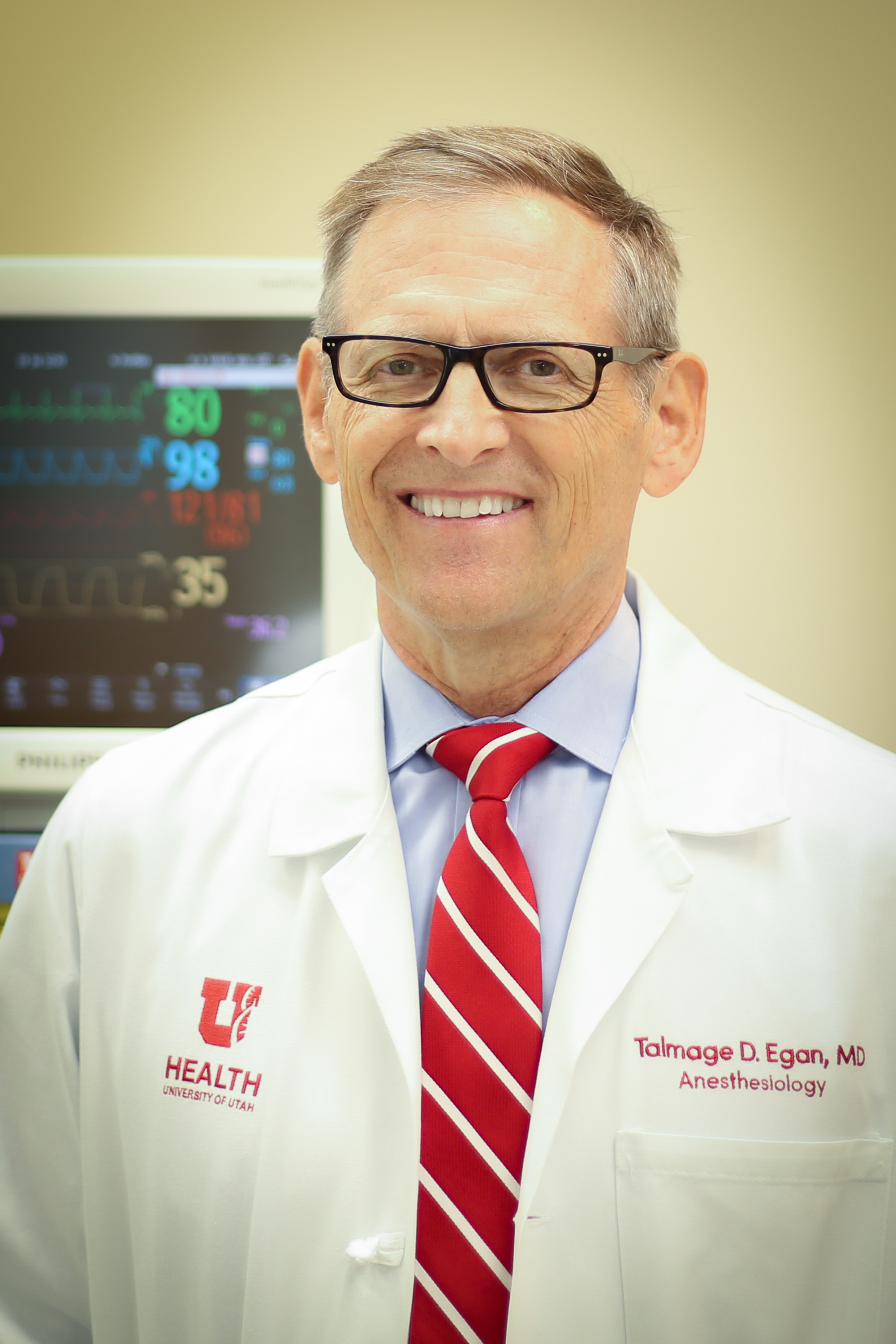
- Occupations: Physician, anesthesiologist, academic, entrepreneur, and author

Academic background
- Education: B.A., and M.D.
- Alma mater: Brigham Young University; University of Utah School of Medicine

Academic work
- Institutions: Stanford University, Department of Anesthesiology, University of Utah, Department of Anesthesiology, and Imperial College London

Talmage D. Egan is an American anesthesiologist, clinical scientist, and academic leader. He is a professor and the former chair of the Department of Anesthesiology at the University of Utah Health Sciences Center. Egan is recognized for his expertise in total intravenous anesthesia (TIVA) and contributions to clinical practice, training, and research in anesthesiology.

Egan's research interests revolve around clinical pharmacology investigative methods applied to the development and understanding of novel intravenous anesthetics and opioids, optimal anesthetic drug administration regimens, computer controlled drug delivery, and anesthetic drug interactions.

== Education ==
In 1978, Egan graduated from Olympus High School in Salt Lake City. Subsequently, he enrolled at Brigham Young University and completed his undergraduate studies in the humanities. He attended medical school at the University of Utah School of Medicine, graduating in 1986. After completing a preliminary residency in general surgery at the University of Utah in 1988, he pursued postgraduate training in anesthesiology, which he began at the University of Utah and completed at Stanford University in 1991. Following residency, he also completed a fellowship in clinical pharmacology at Stanford. Egan took sabbatical as a visiting scientist at the Imperial College in London, UK in 2000, studying anesthetic pharmacology using functional magnetic resonance techniques.

== Career ==
Egan started his academic career as a clinical instructor and assistant professor for the department of anesthesiology at Stanford University. He relocated to the University of Utah as an assistant professor in 1993, eventually becoming professor. Since 2004, he has been a professor of anesthesiology, with adjunct positions in the departments of pharmaceutics, bioengineering, and neurosurgery. Egan served as president of the medical staff and chair of the medical board at the University of Utah Health Sciences Center from 2006 to 2008.

Egan was the holder of the K.C. Wong Presidential Endowed Chair in the Department of Anesthesiology at the University of Utah from 2004 until 2026 when he stepped down as department chair. He was succeeded by Grace Lim in 2026.

His clinical practice focused primarily on obstetrical and neuroanesthesia; he served as the chief of neuroanesthesia at the University of Utah for over 10 years.

Egan is the principal creator of Safe Sedation Training (SST), a virtual preceptorship for training non-anesthesia professionals in procedural sedation. He is a founding owner of a medical education and consulting company Applied Medical Visualizations.

Egan has trademarks and patents in connection with this work.

Egan served as an associate editor of the scientific journal Anesthesiology from 1999 to 2005 and as associate editor of the British Journal of Anaesthesia from 2013 to 2023.

Egan has lectured on intravenous anesthesia techniques and concepts in the US and internationally, including honorary and keynote lectures (see Awards and Honors). For example, he has participated in academic events such as serving as a guest judge and lecturer at Duke University’s annual academic evening, and also numerous visiting professorships at institutions such as Harvard, Cornell, the Karolinska Institute, and Washington University.

== Research ==
Egan has authored over 150 publications. A significant part of Egan's work has been focused on drug interactions and computer controlled drug delivery systems. He has worked on developing various methods of total intravenous anesthesia (TIVA), has demonstrated the clinical use of the short acting opioid remifentanil, and defined pharmacodynamic interactions between intravenous anesthetics i.e., propofol and opioids. Much of his research focuses on the pharmacological and therapeutic principles of sedatives and analgesic drugs.

He has been recognized internationally for his work on the development and clinical application of the short acting opioid remifentanil and its interaction with intravenous hypnotics such as propofol, contributing to improved drug delivery regimens and patient safety practices in anesthesia.

Egan’s investigations have developed remifentanil propofol interaction models to predict responsiveness and reaction to surgical stimuli during anesthesia, helping to refine anesthesia dosing regimens and improve clinical outcomes. These studies include assessments of remifentanil propofol response surface models in patients undergoing elective surgery, demonstrating the predictive value and limitations of propofol-opioid interaction models.

Egan’s scholarly output includes editorials and reviews that articulate conceptual advances in anesthetic drug delivery, such as discussions on multimodal general anesthesia and the central role of opioid based strategies within balanced anesthesia paradigms. His prize winning textbook on anesthetic pharmacology and physiology, Pharmacology and Physiology for Anesthesia: Foundations and Clinical Application, has been recognized by professional bodies and has contributed to education in the field.

Later in his career, working with his Stanford colleagues Drs. Thomas Schnider (Switzerland) and Charles Minto (Australia), Egan contributed to the development of a novel concept in anesthesia clinical pharmacology known as the “drug titration paradox,” a concept that has important implications for anesthesia pharmacology research.

Collectively, Egan’s research has influenced both theoretical understanding and practical management of anesthetic drug administration, particularly in TIVA techniques involving remifentanil, pharmacokinetic modeling of anesthetic interactions, and the optimization of sedation and analgesia in perioperative care.

== Personal life ==
Egan married Julie Cook in 1984. They have five children. He is a member of the Church of Jesus Christ of Latter-day Saints (LDS) and served as a volunteer missionary in Sendai, Japan, from 1979 to 1981. He later served as a lay pastor (bishop) of a University of Utah LDS student congregation from 2011 to 2014. He has published numerous essays relating to his faith in various LDS forums.

== Awards and honors ==
- 1997 - Teaching Recognition Award, International Anesthesia Research Society
- 1998 – FAER/Roche Pharmaceuticals Clinical Research Award, Foundation for Anesthesia Education & Research
- 2001 – Jan Kukral Distinguished Lecturer Award, Northwestern University School of Medicine
- 2003 – Ralph M. Waters Visiting Professor, University of Wisconsin Medical School
- 2010 – Ellis Gillespie Keynote Lecturer Award, Australian-New Zealand College of Anaesthetists
- 2015 - Oriental Congress of Anesthesia Keynote Lecture (Shanghai, China)
- 2016 – Lifetime Achievement Award, International Society for Anaesthetic Pharmacology
- 2019 – Highly Commended Book Award, British Medical Association
- 2022 – Mohamed Naguib Honorary Lecturer, International Society of Anaesthetic Pharmacology
- 2022 – 52nd Annual E.A. Rovenstine Memorial Lecturer, New York State Society of Anesthesiologists

== Bibliography ==
=== Books ===
- Anesthesia for the New Millennium (1999) ISBN 978079235632-5
- Pharmacology and Physiology for Anesthesia: Foundations and Clinical Application (2013) ISBN 9781437716795
- Pharmacology and Physiology for Anesthesia: Foundations and Clinical Application 2nd Edition (2019) ISBN 9780323481106
- Pharmacology and Physiology for Anesthesia: Foundations and Clinical Application 3rd Edition (2026)

=== Selected articles ===
- Egan, T. D.; Lemmens, H. J.; Fiset, P.; Hermann, D. J.; Muir, K. T.; Stanski, D. R.; Shafer, S. L. (November 1993). "The pharmacokinetics of the new short-acting opioid remifentanil (GI87084B) in healthy adult male volunteers". Anesthesiology. 79 (5): 881–892. doi:10.1097/00000542-199311000-00004. ISSN 0003-3022.
- Egan, T. D. (August 1995). "Remifentanil pharmacokinetics and pharmacodynamics. A preliminary appraisal". Clinical Pharmacokinetics. 29 (2): 80–94. doi:10.2165/00003088-199529020-00003. ISSN 0312-5963.
- Minto, C. F.; Schnider, T. W.; Egan, T. D.; Youngs, E.; Lemmens, H. J.; Gambus, P. L.; Billard, V.; Hoke, J. F.; Moore, K. H.; Hermann, D. J.; Muir, K. T.; Mandema, J. W.; Shafer, S. L. (January 1997). "Influence of age and gender on the pharmacokinetics and pharmacodynamics of remifentanil. I. Model development". Anesthesiology. 86 (1): 10–23. doi:10.1097/00000542-199701000-00004. ISSN 0003-3022.
- Egan, T. D.; Huizinga, B.; Gupta, S. K.; Jaarsma, R. L.; Sperry, R. J.; Yee, J. B.; Muir, K. T. (September 1998). "Remifentanil pharmacokinetics in obese versus lean patients". Anesthesiology. 89 (3): 562–573. doi:10.1097/00000542-199809000-00004. ISSN 0003-3022.
- Egan, T. D.; Sharma, A.; Ashburn, M. A.; Kievit, J.; Pace, N. L.; Streisand, J. B. (March 2000). "Multiple dose pharmacokinetics of oral transmucosal fentanyl citrate in healthy volunteers". Anesthesiology. 92 (3): 665–673. doi:10.1097/00000542-200003000-00009. ISSN 0003-3022.
- Kern, Steven E.; Xie, Guoming; White, Julia L.; Egan, Talmage D. (June 2004). "A response surface analysis of propofol-remifentanil pharmacodynamic interaction in volunteers". Anesthesiology. 100 (6): 1373–1381. doi:10.1097/00000542-200406000-00007. ISSN 0003-3022.
- Kern, Steven E.; Xie, Guoming; White, Julia L.; Egan, Talmage D. (2004). "A response surface analysis of propofol-remifentanil pharmacodynamic interaction in volunteers". Anesthesiology. 100 (6): 1373–1381. doi:10.1097/00000542-200406000-00007. ISSN 0003-3022. PMID 15166554.
- Johnson, Ken B.; Egan, Talmage D.; Kern, Steven E.; McJames, Scott W.; Cluff, Mark L.; Pace, Nathan L. (2004). "Influence of hemorrhagic shock followed by crystalloid resuscitation on propofol: a pharmacokinetic and pharmacodynamic analysis". Anesthesiology. 101 (3): 647–659. doi:10.1097/00000542-200409000-00013. ISSN 0003-3022. PMID 15329589.
- Egan, Talmage D.; Obara, Shinju; Jenkins, Thomas E.; Jaw-Tsai, Sarah S.; Amagasu, Shanti; Cook, Daniel R.; Steffensen, Scott C.; Beattie, David T. (2012). "AZD-3043: a novel, metabolically labile sedative-hypnotic agent with rapid and predictable emergence from hypnosis". Anesthesiology. 116 (6): 1267–1277. doi:10.1097/ALN.0b013e31825685a6. ISSN 1528-1175. PMC 4056591. PMID 22531340.
- Kim, Tae Kyun; Obara, Shinju; Egan, Talmage D.; Minto, Charles F.; La Colla, Luca; Drover, David R.; Vuyk, Jaap; Mertens, Martijn; the Remifentanil Pharmacokinetics in Obesity Investigators (2017). "Disposition of Remifentanil in Obesity: A New Pharmacokinetic Model Incorporating the Influence of Body Mass". Anesthesiology. 126 (6): 1019–1032. doi:10.1097/ALN.0000000000001635. ISSN 1528-1175. PMID 28509796.
- Egan, Talmage D. (2019). "Are opioids indispensable for general anaesthesia?". British Journal of Anaesthesia. 122 (6): e127–e135. doi:10.1016/j.bja.2019.02.018. ISSN 0007-0912.
