= John Regehr =

American computer scientist

- Education: University of Virginia (PhD)
- Occupations: Computer science professor, University of Utah
- Known for: Csmith, Clang integer overflow analyzer
- Website: www.cs.utah.edu/~regehr/

John Regehr is a computer scientist specializing in compiler correctness and undefined behavior. As of 2016, he is a professor at the University of Utah. He is best known for the integer overflow sanitizer which was merged into the Clang C compiler, the C compiler fuzzer Csmith, and his widely read blog Embedded in Academia. He spent the 2015–2016 academic year on sabbatical in Paris, France, working with TrustInSoft on Frama-C and related code analysis tools.
