= David N. Sundwall =

American physician

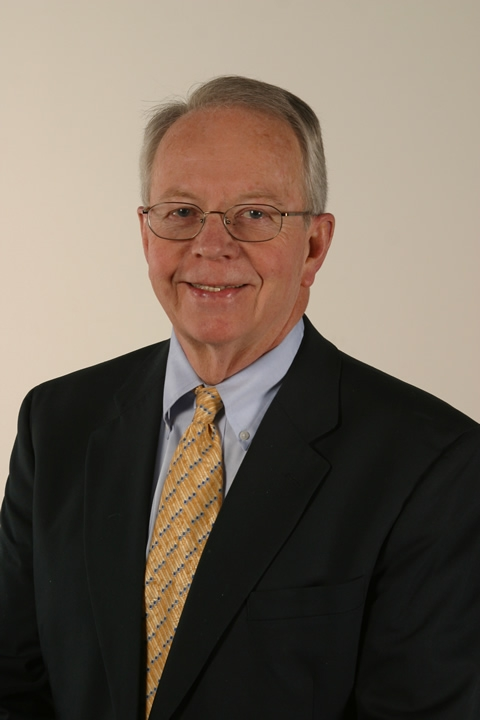
David N. Sundwall

Dr. David N. Sundwall (May 22, 1941 - April 8, 2024) was a primary care physician and served as the executive director of the Utah Department of Health from January 2005 to January 2011.

== Biography ==
Sundwall was born and raised in Murray, Utah. Professional opportunities took Sundwall and his family to Boston, MA, San Francisco, CA, Silver Spring, MD, and, in 2004, back to Murray, UT.

== Background ==
Sundwall followed several family members into the medical profession, including his father, Dr. Val Sundwall, who had his own private clinic in Murray, UT. Other role models include his great uncles Dr. Olaf Sundwall and Dr. John Sundwall, and brother, Dr. Peter Sundwall.

== Medical and Public Health career ==
Dr. Sundwall earned his medical degree at the University of Utah College of Medicine and completed further training at the Harvard Family Medicine Residency Program. He remained on the faculty of the University of Utah School of Medicine as Associate Professor in the Department of Family and Preventive Medicine until his death. Through his career, Sundwall maintained his clinical connection to patients. He volunteered a half day each week at the HealthCare for Homeless Project (now Unity Health Care), a public clinic near the U.S. Capitol in Washington, D.C. for 17 years. After returning to Utah, Sundwall volunteered at the now defunct Health Clinics of Utah (defunded by the Utah State Legislature in 2020) and, until December 2023, at the Maliheh Free Clinic and the Midvale Community Clinic.

Dr. Sundwall was President of the American Clinical Laboratory Association (from 1994 to 2003) before acting as ACLA's Senior Medical and Scientific Officer. He holds three medical school faculty appointments, including as a Clinical Associate Professor in the Department of Community and Family Medicine at Georgetown University College of Medicine in Washington, D.C.

He held numerous positions in the public health sector: from 1988 to 1994, he was Vice President and Medical Director of American Healthcare Systems, an alliance of not-for-profit multi-hospital systems. Prior to that appointment, he was Administrator in the Health Resources and Services Administration.

Dr. Sundwall served as an advisor, task force member and chairman of numerous committees involved with public health policy and quality including those connected with the Centers for Disease Control and Prevention and the Food and Drug Administration.

Sundwall's federal experience included serving as the Assistant Surgeon General in the Commissioned Corps of the U.S. Public Health Service. During this period, he had adjunct responsibilities at the Department of Health and Human Services (HHS) including: Co-Chairman of the HHS Secretary's Task Force on Medical Liability and Malpractice, and was the HHS Secretary's Designee to the National Commission to Prevent Infant Mortality.

Dr. Sundwall is an author or coauthor of numerous publications in peer-reviewed medical literature. He also contributed chapters to many books covering a broad spectrum of healthcare issues. He was licensed to practice medicine in the District of Columbia and Utah, and was a member of the American Medical Association (AMA) and the American Academy of Family Physicians (AAFP). He was on the board of Trustees at Spelman College in Atlanta, GA.

Dr. Sundwall was broadly recognized for his professional achievements and contributions to healthcare policy and advocacy.

== Government service ==
In 1981, Sundwall moved to Washington to work as director of the health staff of the U.S. Senate Labor and Human Resources Committee, chaired by Orrin Hatch. Hatch assembled an expert staff to work on health issues that included Sundwall, future FDA Commissioner David Aaron Kessler, future Surgeon General Antonia Novello, and lobbyist Nancy Taylor. Even during the Reagan administration, the group was a hotbed of activity on organ transplantation, orphan drugs, food safety, tobacco safety and regulation, professional training for healthcare workers, cancer research and a variety of other issues.

With the assistance of Dr. Ronald Preston (who would later be Massachusetts Secretary of Health and Human Services under Gov. Mitt Romney) the group pushed for greater awareness of the science behind the harmful effects of ionizing radiation to "downwinders." In a series of hearings and associated bills, the group worked to compensate or create access to healthcare for Americans, chiefly in Utah, injured from radioactive fallout from atomic bomb tests and to exposure to radiation through uranium mining and refining operations.

After 23 years of working in various government and private sector health positions in Washington, D.C., Sundwall returned to Utah to lead the Utah Department of Health (UDOH). His nomination to serve as the Executive Director of the UDOH by Governor Jon Huntsman, Jr., was confirmed by the Utah State Senate on January 17, 2005.

Sundwall continued to serve as Executive Director of UDOH under Gov. Gary Herbert, who succeeded Huntsman when Huntsman was appointed Ambassador to China in 2009. Sundwall resigned as director in January 2011.
