= Adam M. Duncan =

American lawyer

Adam M. Duncan (1927–2000) was a member of the Utah state legislature and a prominent attorney and civil rights leader in Utah.

Duncan was born in Salt Lake City. As a young man Duncan served a mission for the Church of Jesus Christ of Latter-day Saints in South Africa. He received his law degree from the University of Utah. He was a trial attorney. He was a founder of the Utah branches of the ACLU and the NAACP.

== Sources ==
- Deseret News obituary
- Russell W.Stevenson. For the Cause of Righteousness: A Global History of Blacks and Mormonism, 1830-2013 Salt Lake City: Greg Kofford Books, 2013. p. 108-109.
