= Stefan M. Pulst =

American neurologist

- Born: Lehndorf, Germany; 1955
- Education: Medizinische Hochschule Hannover
- Known for: Translational neuroscience, human molecular genetics
- Awards: Cotzias Award, Singhal Award, AAAS fellow
- Scientific career
- Fields: Neurology; Neurodegenerative disorders
- Workplaces: University of Utah
- Doctoral advisor: Peter Haller

Stefan M. Pulst is Chairman of the Department of Neurology at the University of Utah in Salt Lake City. He trained in neurology at Medizinische Hochschule Hannover in Germany and at Harvard Medical School, Boston, in the Longwood Neurology Program. He was a visiting scientist at the Brain Tumor Center at UCSF, and subsequently a post-doctoral fellow with Earl Mayeri, Ph.D., in the Department of Physiology working on the multi-peptide bag cell transmitter system in Aplysia. He established his laboratory at Cedars-Sinai Medical Center/UCLA in Los Angeles in 1987 focusing on genetic analysis of neurological diseases. He became the Carmen and Lou Warschaw Chair of Neurology at Cedars-Sinai Medical Center in 1990.

He was chair of the science committee of the American Academy of Neurology and served on the Board of Directors. He then chaired the Meeting Management Committee. He was founding editor of Neurology:Genetics in 2015 and has continued in this role.

His research uses molecular and genetic tools to understand human brain diseases . His research on age-dependent neurodegenerative diseases involves ataxia, especially SCA2, SCA13, as well as ALS and Parkinson disease.

He is recipient of the George C. Cotzias award from the American Academy of Neurology and the Senator Jacob Javits award from NINDS. He received the Singhal Movement Disorders Award from the World Federation of Neurology. He became an elected fellow of AAAS in 2021.
