= Non-photorealistic rendering =

Style of rendering

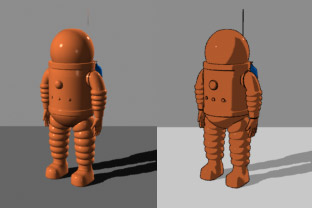
A normal shader (left) and an NPR shader using cel-shading (right)

Non-photorealistic rendering (NPR) is an area of computer graphics that focuses on enabling a wide variety of expressive styles for digital art, in contrast to traditional computer graphics, which focuses on photorealism. NPR is inspired by other artistic modes such as painting, drawing, technical illustration, and animated cartoons. NPR has appeared in movies and video games in the form of cel-shaded animation (also known as "toon" shading) as well as in scientific visualization, architectural illustration and experimental animation.

== History and criticism of the term ==
The term non-photorealistic rendering is believed to have been coined by the SIGGRAPH 1990 papers committee, who held a session entitled "Non Photo Realistic Rendering".

The term has received some criticism:

- The term "photorealism" has different meanings for graphics researchers (see "photorealistic rendering") and artists. For artists—who are the target consumers of NPR techniques—it refers to a school of painting that focuses on reproducing the effect of a camera lens, with all the distortion and hyper-reflections that it creates. For graphics researchers, however, it refers to an image that is visually indistinguishable from reality. In fact, graphics researchers lump the kinds of visual distortions that are used by photorealist painters into "non-photorealism".
- Describing something by what it is not is problematic. Equivalent (made-up) comparisons might be "non-elephant biology" or "non-geometric mathematics". NPR researchers have stated that they expect the term will disappear eventually and be replaced by the now more general term "computer graphics", with "photorealistic graphics" being the term used to describe "traditional" computer graphics.
- Many techniques that are used to create 'non-photorealistic' images are not rendering techniques. They are modelling techniques, or post-processing techniques. While the latter are coming to be known as 'image-based rendering', sketch-based modelling techniques, cannot technically be included under this heading, which is very inconvenient for conference organisers.

The first conference on non-photorealistic animation and rendering included a discussion of possible alternative names. Among those suggested were "expressive graphics", "artistic rendering", "non-realistic graphics", "art-based rendering", and "psychographics". All of these terms have been used in various research papers on the topic, but the "non-photorealistic" term seems to have nonetheless taken hold.

The first technical meeting dedicated to NPR was the ACM-sponsored Symposium on Non-Photorealistic Rendering and Animation(NPAR) in 2000. NPAR is traditionally co-located with the Annecy Animated Film Festival, running on even numbered years. From 2007 onward, NPAR began to also run on odd-numbered years, co-located with ACM SIGGRAPH.

== 3D ==
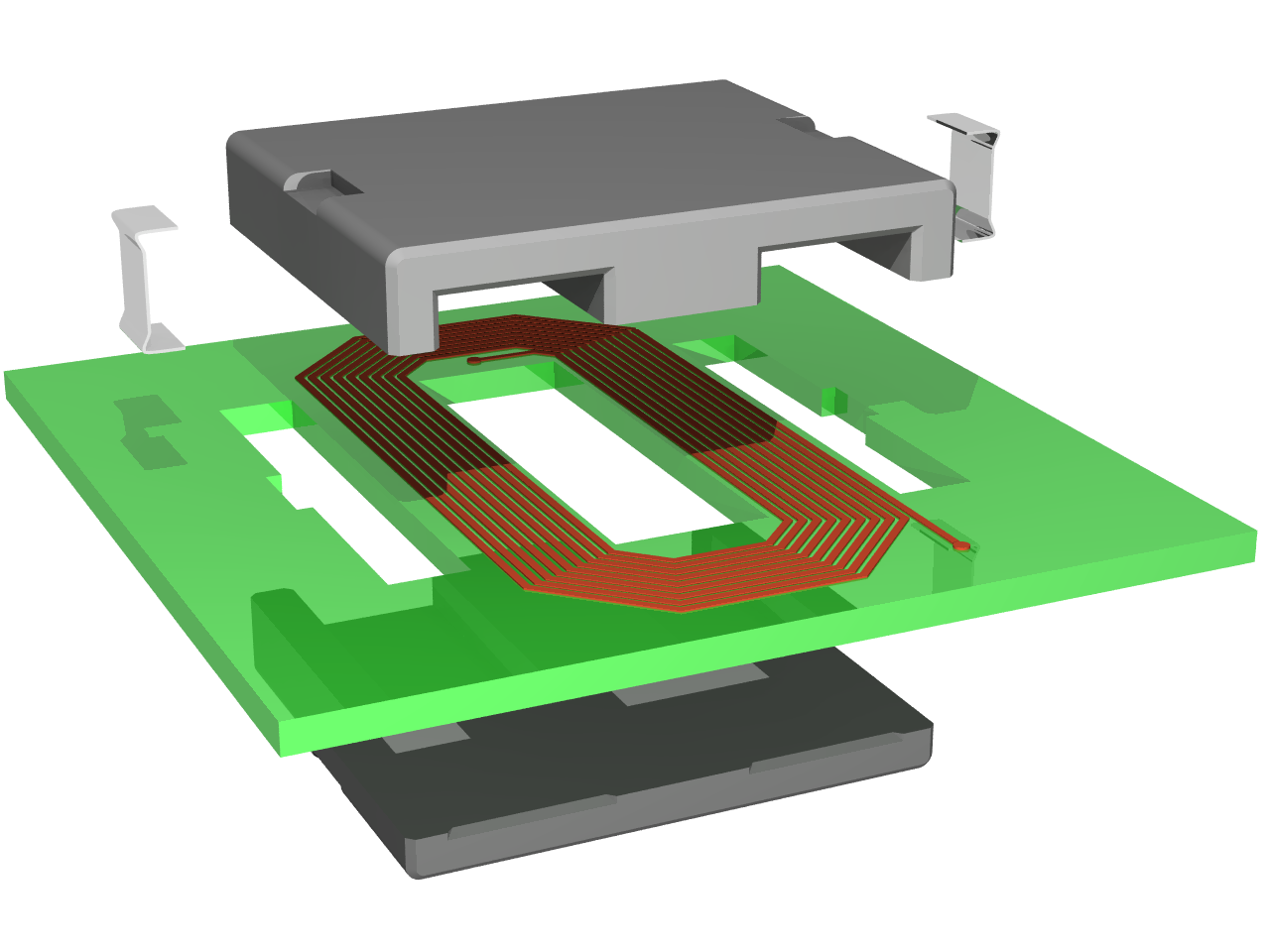
An example of NPR used for technical illustrations

Three-dimensional NPR is the style that is most commonly seen in video games and movies. The output from this technique is almost always a 3D model that has been modified from the original input model to portray a new artistic style. In many cases, the geometry of the model is identical to the original geometry, and only the material applied to the surface is modified. With increased availability of programmable GPU's, shaders have allowed NPR effects to be applied to the rasterised image that is to be displayed to the screen. The majority of NPR techniques applied to 3D geometry are intended to make the scene appear two-dimensional.

NPR techniques for 3D images include cel shading and Gooch shading.

Many methods can be used to draw stylized outlines and strokes from 3D models, including occluding contours and Suggestive contours.

For enhanced legibility, the most useful technical illustrations for technical communication are not necessarily photorealistic. Non-photorealistic renderings, such as exploded view diagrams, greatly assist in showing placement of parts in a complex system.

Cartoon rendering, also called cel shading or toon shading, is a non-photorealistic rendering technique used to give 3D computer graphics a flat, cartoon-like appearance. Its defining feature is the use of distinct shading colors rather than smooth gradients, producing a look reminiscent of comic books or animated films. This technique is often used to blend 3D objects and environments with 2D hand-animated elements while maintaining a consistent look. Treasure Planet movie by Disney is an example of blending these techniques.

== 2D ==
A non-photorealistic rendering of an existing 2D (photographic) image

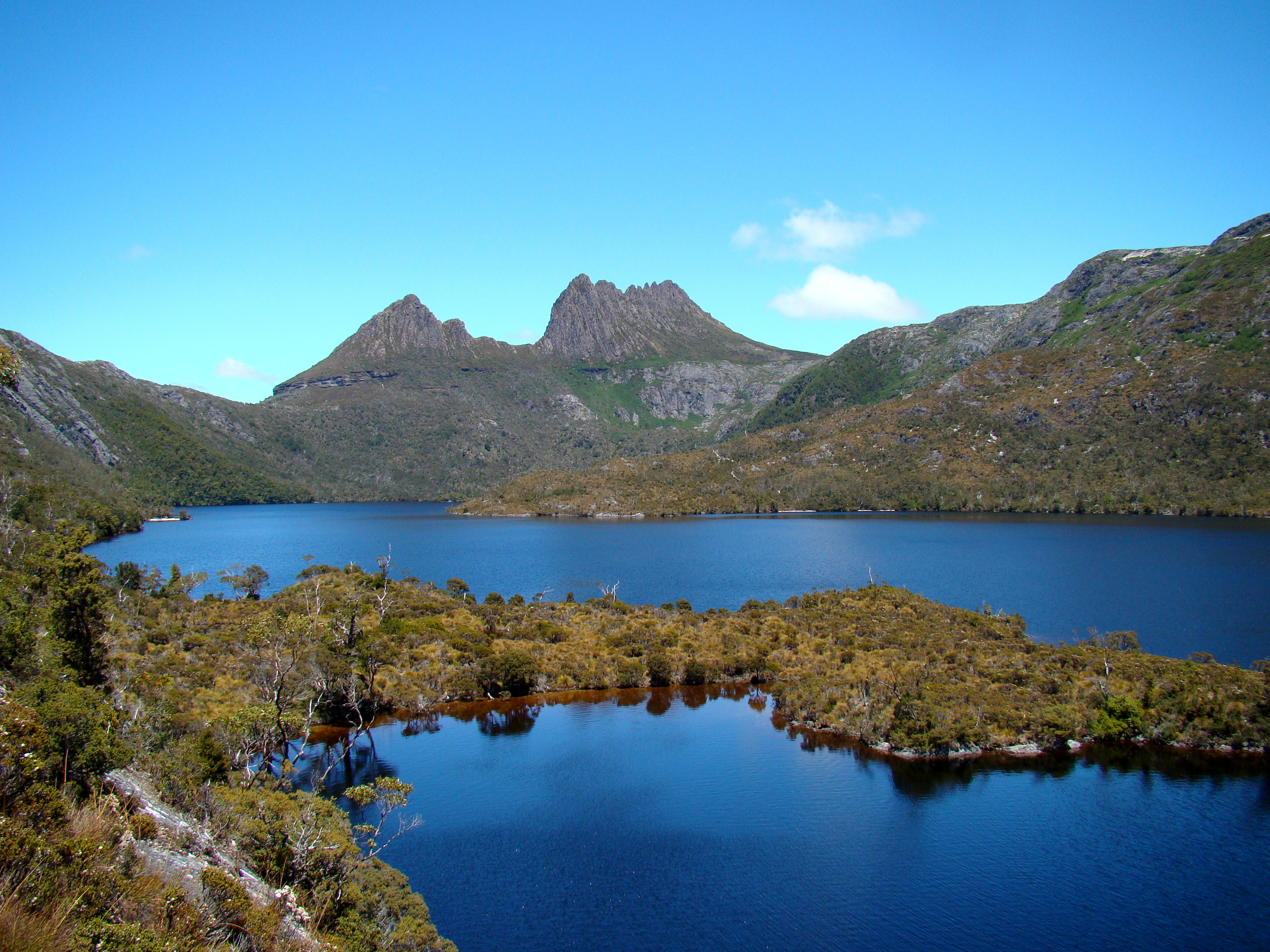
Original here

The input to a two dimensional NPR system is typically an image or video. The output is a typically an artistic rendering of that input imagery (for example in a watercolor, painterly or sketched style) although some 2D NPR serves non-artistic purposes e.g. data visualization.

The artistic rendering of images and video (often referred to as image stylization) traditionally focused upon heuristic algorithms that seek to simulate the placement of brush strokes on a digital canvas.

Arguably, the earliest example of 2D NPR is Paul Haeberli's 'Paint by Numbers' at SIGGRAPH 1990. This (and similar interactive techniques) provide the user with a canvas that they can "paint" on using the cursor — as the user paints, a stylized version of the image is revealed on the canvas. This is especially useful for people who want to simulate different sizes of brush strokes according to different areas of the image.

Subsequently, basic image processing operations using gradient operators or statistical moments were used to automate this process and minimize user interaction in the late nineties (although artistic control remains with the user via setting parameters of the algorithms). This automation enabled practical application of 2D NPR to video, for the first time in the living paintings of the movie What Dreams May Come (1998).

More sophisticated image abstractions techniques were developed in the early 2000s harnessing computer vision operators e.g. image salience, or segmentation operators to drive stroke placement. Around this time, machine learning began to influence image stylization algorithms notably image analogy that could learn to mimic the style of an existing artwork.

The advent of deep learning has re-kindled activity in image stylization, notably with neural style transfer (NST) algorithms that can mimic a wide gamut of artistic styles from single visual examples. These algorithms underpin mobile apps capable of the same e.g. Prisma.

In addition to the above stylization methods, a related class of techniques in 2D NPR address the simulation of artistic media. These methods include simulating the diffusion of ink through different kinds of paper, and also of pigments through water for simulation of watercolor.

== Artistic rendering ==
Artistic rendering is the application of visual art styles to rendering. For photorealistic rendering styles, the emphasis is on accurate reproduction of light-and-shadow and the surface properties of the depicted objects, composition, or other more generic qualities. When the emphasis is on unique interpretive rendering styles, visual information is interpreted by the artist and displayed accordingly using the chosen art medium and level of abstraction in abstract art. In computer graphics, interpretive rendering styles are known as non-photorealistic rendering styles, but may be used to simplify technical illustrations. Rendering styles that combine photorealism with non-photorealism are known as hyperrealistic rendering styles.

== Notable films and games ==
This section lists some seminal uses of NPR techniques in films, games and software. See cel-shaded animation for a list of uses of toon-shading in games and movies.

Short films
Technological Threat	1988	Early use of toon shading together with Tex Avery-style cartoon characters
Gas Planet	1992	Pencil-sketching 3D rendering by Eric Darnell
Fishing	2000	Watercolor-style 3D rendering David Gainey
RoadHead; Snack and Drink	1998; 1999	Short films created with Rotoshop by Bob Sabiston
Ryan	2004	Nonlinear projection and other distortions of 3D geometry
The Girl Who Cried Flowers	2008	Watercolor-style rendering by Auryn
Feature films
What Dreams May Come	1998	Painterly rendering in the "painted world" sequence
Tarzan	1999	First use of Disney's "Deep Canvas" system
Waking Life	2001	First use of rotoshop in a feature film
A Scanner Darkly	2006	"a 15-month animation process"
Spider-Man: Into the Spider-Verse	2018	Creators wanted to create the feeling that the viewer "walked inside a comic book"
Spider-Man: Across the Spider-Verse	2023	Incorporated NPR techniques to develop several different animation styles, including impressionistic watercolor style.
Video games
Jet Set Radio	2000	Early use of toon-shading in video games
The Legend of Zelda: The Wind Waker	2002	One of the most well-known cel-shaded games
Valkyria Chronicles	2008	Uses a number of NPR techniques in the game, including a sketch-like shading method
XIII	2003	A game made as "comic"-like as possible
Ōkami	2006	A game whose visuals emulate the style of sumi-e (Japanese ink wash painting)
Guilty Gear Xrd	2014	Fighting game using cel-shaded 3D characters with limited animation to imitate the look of 2D sprites
Return of the Obra Dinn	2018	A 3D game rendered in a unique monochrome, pointillist style
Manifold Garden	2019	A 3D puzzle game using impossible geometry, notable for its novel edge-shading techniques.
Software for non-photorealistic rendering
SketchUp	2000	Sketch-like modelling software with toon rendering
Vue Xstream	2015	3D environment creation software featuring an NPR renderer with various traditional art style emulating presets
