= Kenjiro Tsuda =

Japanese actor and director (born 1971)

- 津田 健次郎
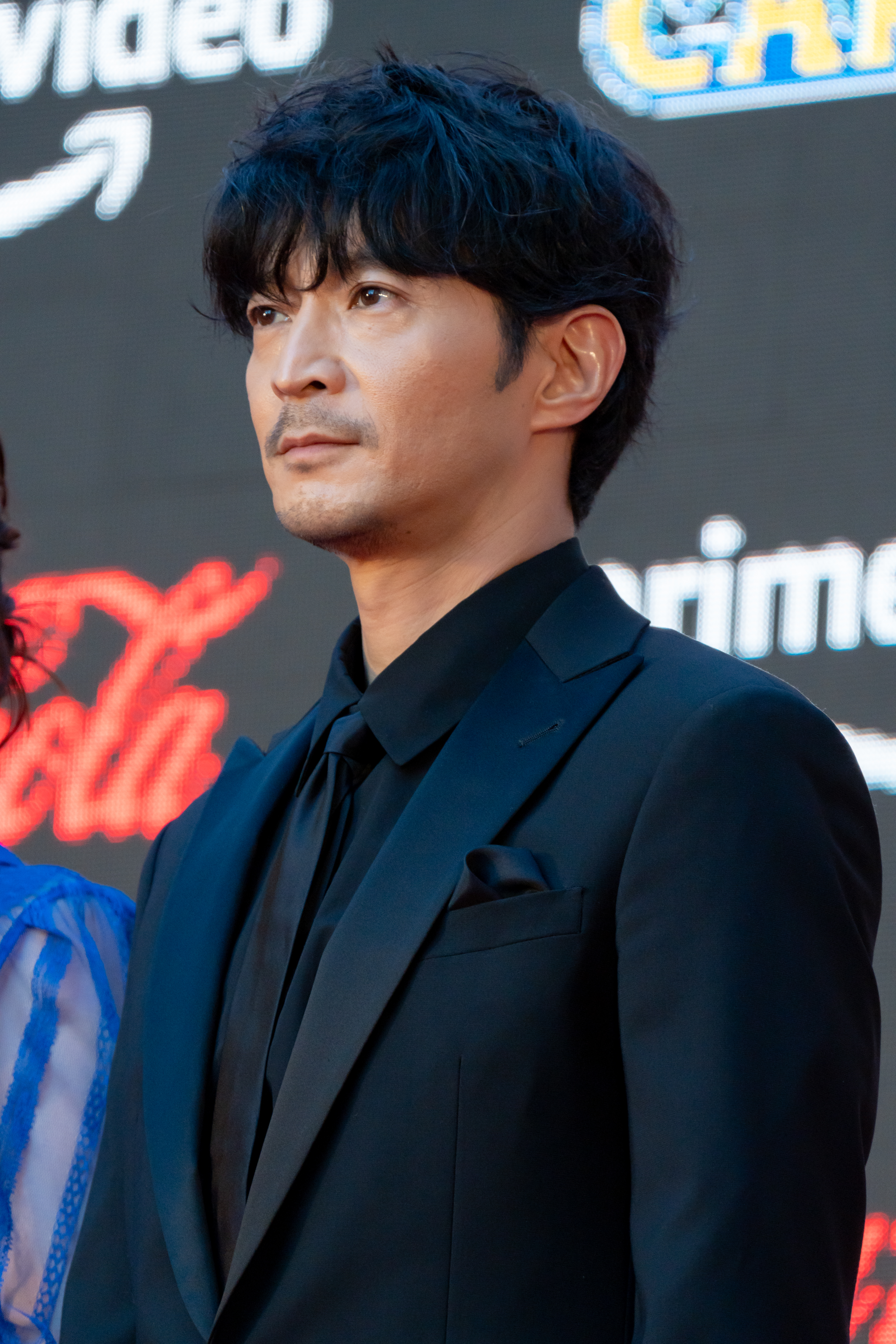
- Tsuda at the 36th Tokyo International Film Festival in October 2023
- Born: June 11, 1971 (age 55); Osaka Prefecture, Japan
- Status: Married
- Education: Meiji University
- Occupations: Actor; voice actor; film director
- Years active: 1995–present
- Agent: ANDSTIR
- Children: 2
- Website: tsudaken.jp

Kenjiro Tsuda (津田 健次郎, Tsuda Kenjirō; born June 11, 1971) is a Japanese actor, voice actor, and film director, affiliated with the talent agency ANDSTIR.

== Early life ==
Tsuda lived in Jakarta until he was seven years old. He attended Meiji University, where he majored in theater studies in the department of literature. He wanted to become a film director when he became interested in the field of performance. At the En • Theater Research Institute, he took and passed a non-degree course, being enthusiastic about theater work.

== Career ==
After graduating from a trading school, Tsuda entered a theatre group office for auditions. He starred in the 1995 anime series H2. He had lived in poverty to the extent of agonizing over buying even a single piece of bread, but the work became a turning point for him.

Tsuda likes both filming and watching movies. While in university, he joined a film making club. He attended movie theaters in junior high and watched western films until senior high, focusing on artistic films after entering college. However, his interest lies in non-genre films.

In 2017, Tsuda replaced some of Keiji Fujiwara's roles in anime series, including Space Battleship Yamato 2202: Warriors of Love and Attack on Titan.

On February 2, 2019, Tsuda debuted as a film director with the release of Documentertainment AD-LIVE, Documentertainment being a portmanteau of documentary and entertainment.

On November 24, 2020, Actor's Short Film was launched by Wowow to commemorate the station's thirtieth year since opening. Five actors, facing the same conditions, such as budget and time, would individually direct short films up to 25 minutes long each. One of them would be chosen, based on the votes of viewers and film critics, to be presented at the Short Shorts Film Festival & Asia held in 2021 – which was announced on Twitter; Tsuda starred in the short film GET SET GO, alongside Ryo Ryusei and Shunsuke Daito. Distribution of the films began on January 13, 2021. He was announced to voice Figarland Shamrock for One Piece, it was announced in the promotional video for One Piece Volume 113.

Tsuda made a cameo appearance in the morning drama Yell. Since then, he has achieved success on series such as Dearest (2021) and Ōoku: The Inner Chambers and Reversal Orchestra, both in 2023. In 2023, his photo book recorded second place, unusual for a photo book of a voice actor over fifty years old.

In November 2025, Tsuda filed a lawsuit in Tokyo against TikTok for alleged unauthorized of his voice in AI-generated speech in videos on the platform and sought the removal of videos containing such voice. Tsuda's case is centered on it being an exploitation of his publicity rights while TikTok claimed that it is "a generic male voice that lacks a distinct speaking style, arguing that Tsuda's claims are entirely subjective". As of May 2026, the case was ongoing. He later won the case that fall.

== Personal life ==
Tsuda married a woman he encountered around when he was starting out as a stage actor, who he mentioned in his Instagram announcement to not be a celebrity, and they have two children. By not officially announcing his marriage, Tsuda thought that he could protect his family. Another reason for this approach is the large appeal that his favorite actors have carried as figures who have not displayed their private lives, and he had thoughts of wanting to become an expressive person like that. He never made his marriage public; however, in July 2020, he received notice that a news story about his marriage had been published in one section of the weekly magazine Shūkanshi and decided to bring these facts to light via his Instagram.

== Filmography ==
=== Anime series ===
Year	Title	Role(s)	Details
1995	H2	Atsushi Noda	
1996	Kodomo no Omocha (Kodocha)	Takamitsu Kawai, Ryousuke Kashima	
1996	Mizuiro Jidai	Science teacher	
1996	Rurouni Kenshin	Toramaru	
1999	Ojarumaru (1999–present)	Haunted house obake director, director, man, salaryman, Ojarumaru's great-great-grandfather	
1999	KochiKame: Tokyo Beat Cops (1999–2004)	Hideyoshi Toyotomi, Matsukichi Katou, inspection team member	
1999	Medabots	Shatei	
2000	Carried by the Wind: Tsukikage Rain	Man, Minokichi	
2000	Hidamari no Ki	Ieyasu Tokugawa	
2000	Yu-Gi-Oh! Duel Monsters (2000–2004)	Seto Kaiba, Critias, Priest Seto	
2001	Kurukuru Ami-	Ginji, animals, physician, dog, thief	
2001	The Prince of Tennis (2001–2012)	Sadaharu Inui	2 series
2003	Ashita no Nadja	Harvey Livingston	
2004	BECK: Mongolian Chop Squad	Rikiya Kitazawa	
2004	Legendz	Gargoyle	
2005	AIR	Keisuke Tachibana	
2005	capeta	Kei Kajiwara	
2005	Glass Mask	Chairman	
2005	Sugar Sugar Rune	Rockin' Robin	
2005	Speed Grapher	Niihari	
2005	Zoids Genesis	Seijūrō	
2005	Kaiketsu Zorori	Tagojou	
2005	Yu-Gi-Oh! Duel Monsters GX	Seto Kaiba, Kaibaman	
2005	Rockman.EXE Stream	Deep Kabase	
2006	Idaten Jump	Shadow	
2006	Air Gear	Spitfire	
2006	REBORN! (2006–2010)	Lambo (adult), Romeo, Spanner, Lampo	
2006	Glass Fleet	Cleo	
2006	Meine Liebe	Elmunt	
2006	Jinzou Konchū Kabutoborg VxV	President Masahiko Mura	
2006	Naruto	Shin'emon	
2006	Lemon Angel Project	Masami Kudou	
2007	Sisters of Wellber (2007–2008)	Zarado Shisupuri	2 series
2007	Pokémon Mystery Dungeon: Team Go-Getters Out of the Gate!	Lombre	
2007	Kekkaishi	Byaku	
2007	Skull Man	Mitsuo Yamaki	
2007	Saint October	Kurtz	
2007	Bokura No	Ichirō Hasuki	
2007	Detective Conan (2007–2018)	Kiritani, Eizen Fukuhara, Takeshi Onimaru	
2007	Love Com	Ryoji Suzuki	
2008	Black Butler	O'Farrell	
2008	Soul Eater	Mifune	
2008	Nabari no Ou	Kazuhiko Yukimi	
2008	Naruto: Shippuden	Aoba Yamashiro	
2008	Yozakura Quartet	Kousuke Yoshimura	
2009	Slap Up Party: Arad Senki	Orca	
2009	Basquash!	Ganz Bogard	
2009	Metal Fight Beyblade (2009–2012)	Ryūga	
2010	Baka and Test: Summon the Beasts (2010–2012)	Shin Fukuhara, narration, announcement	Narration for 2 seasons, announcement for 2 series
2010	Hakuōki (2010–2016)	Chikage Kazama	4 series
2011	Tiger & Bunny (2011–2022)	Fire Emblem/Nathan Seymour	2 series
2011	Nura: Rise of the Yokai Clan	Douji Ibaraki	
2011	Hen Zemi	Yūji Horii	
2011	Moshidora	Makoto Kachi	
2012	Accel World	Red Rider	
2012	Mobile Suit Gundam AGE	Dole Frost	
2012	Kingdom	Chou Sou	
2012	K-Project (2012–2015)	Mikoto Suoh, Gouki Zenjou	2 series
2012	CØDE:BREAKER	Yukihina	
2012	JoJo's Bizarre Adventure	Bruford	
2012	Toriko	Smile	
2012	Naruto: Rock Lee & His Ninja Pals	Aoba Yamashiro	
2012	Fairy Tail (2012–2015)	Silver Fullbuster, Bacchus Groh	
2013	Ixion Saga DT	Leon	
2013	Inazuma Eleven GO: Galaxy (2013–2014)	Bitway Ozrock, Stag Kwatta	
2013	Space Brothers	Vincent Bold	
2013	DD Fist of the North Star	Yuda	
2013	Duel Masters Victory V3	Sakurada	
2013	Hakkenden: Eight Dogs of the East	Daikaku Inumura	
2013	Free! (2013–2018)	Seijuro Mikoshiba	3 series
2013	Mushibugyou	Manako	
2014	BeyWarriors: BeyRaiderz	Kaiser Gray, Flame	
2014	Orenchi no Furo Jijou	Maki	
2014	Kill la Kill	Jirō Suzaku	
2014	Battle Spirits: Saikyou Ginga Ultimate Zero	Ultimate Alexander	
2014	Rage of Bahamut	Martinet	
2014	Space☆Dandy	Ferdinand	
2014	Dragonar Academy	Dr. Hoffman	
2014	Tokyo Ghoul (2014–2018)	Nico – 4 series	
2014	Nobunagun	Robert Capa	
2014	Ping Pong	Egami	
2014	pupa	Hotoki	
2014	Future Card Buddyfight (2014–2015)	Raremaro Tefudanokimi; Gremlin/Retsu Omori; Boomerang Dragon; Fifth Omni Super Cavalry Dragon, Aurora Spiral Alliot	2 series
2014	Baby Gamba	Noroi	
2014	Houzuki's Coolheadedness (2014–2018)	Yasha-Ichi	3 series
2015	Kamisama Kiss	Nanami's father	
2015	GANGSTA	Nicholas Brown	
2015	Q Transformers: Mystery of Convoy	Thundercracker	
2015	The Kindaichi Case Files	Isshin Matsurizawa	2 times
2015	Ghost in the Shell: Arise – Alternative Architecture	Pyromaniac	
2015	The Testament of Sister New Devil	Mamoru Sakasaki/Ornis	2 series
2015	Anti-Magic Academy: The 35th Test Platoon	Hayato Kurogane	
2015	Cute High Earth Defense Club Love!	Shady shopkeeper	
2015	Sound! Euphonium (2015–2016)	Takuya Gotou	2 series
2015	Plastic Memories	Yasutaka Hanada	
2015	Wish Upon the Pleiades	Hikaru's father	
2015	Pokémon X and Y	Belmondo	
2015	One-Punch Man (2015–2019)	Atomic Samurai	2 series
2016	The Heroic Legend of Arslan: Dust Storm Dance	Grahze	
2016	Monster Strike	K/Genma Kagutsuchi	
2016	Occultic;Nine	Kouhei Izumi	
2016	ALL OUT!! (2016–2017)	Yoshida Satoshi	
2016	SERVAMP	Jeje	
2016	Shounen Ashibe: Go! Go! Goma-chan	Ashibe's father, Yeti, Kanji Koshi, master	
2016	Joker Game	Jirō Gamō	
2016	Taboo Tattoo	R. R. Lurker	
2016	Dimension W	K.K.	
2016	Tales of Zestiria the X	Zaveid	
2016	Touken Ranbu: Hanamaru (2016–2018)	Nihongou	2 series
2016	Tonkatsu DJ Agetarou	Shūgo Oshibori	
2016	91 Days	Fango	
2016	Nanbaka	Mitsuru Hitokoe	
2016	First Love Monster	Arashi Nagasawa	
2016	B-PROJECT～Kodō＊Ambitious	Paparazzi	
2016	BBK/BRNK	Shūsaku Matobai	2 series
2016	TO BE HERO	Ossan/Min's father	
2016	Flip Flappers	Salt	
2016	Lupin the Third: Italian Game	Masked count	
2016	Kiss Him, Not Me	Tera	
2017	Interviews with Monster Girls	Ugaki	
2017	ACCA: 13-Territory Inspection Dept.	Nino	
2017	Hand Shakers	Daichi Nagaoka	
2017	MARGINAL #4 KISS Kara Tsukuru Big Bang	Satsuki Chang	
2017	March Comes in Like a Lion (2017–2018)	Morio Shigeta	2 series
2017	Kirakira☆PreCure a la Mode	Gen'ichirō Usami	
2017	The Dragon Dentist	Gereli	
2017	KonoSuba: God's Blessing on this Wonderful World!	Hans	
2017	Kamiwaza Wanda	Dozermin	
2017	Attack on Titan (2017–2018)	Hannes	2 series
2017	One Piece	Vinsmoke Yonji, Figarland Shamrock	
2017	Love Kome: WE LOVE RICE	Koshihikari	2 series
2017	Akashic Records of Bastard Magic Instructor	Grandmaster	
2017	The Laughing Salesman	Matsuo Ochiiri	
2017	Altair: A Record of Battles	Virgilio Louis	
2017	Saiyuki RELOAD BLAST	Hitoshi Yodo	
2017	In Another World with My Smartphone	Kansuke Yamamoto	
2017	Time Bokan 24: The Villains' Strike Back	O-3	
2017	Magical Circle Guru Guru	Clemente	
2017	UQ Holder!	Afro the Forever	
2017	Neko Neko Nihonshi (2017–2018)	Hosokawa Tadaoki, Emperor Xuanzong of Tang, Manbee	
2018	Gin Tama	Shijaku/Barkas	
2018	The Seven Deadly Sins (2018–2020)	Monspeet	2 series
2018	Violet Evergarden	Damian Baldur Flugel	
2018	JoJo's Bizarre Adventure: Golden Wind	Tiziano	
2018	Hakumei and Mikochi	Narai	
2018	The Ryuo's Work Is Never Done!	Jin Natagiri	
2018	Hakata Tonkotsu Ramens	Chegaru	
2018	Lupin the Third PART 5	Albert d'Andrésy	
2018	Last Hope	Doug Horvat	
2018	Golden Kamuy (2018–2026)	Hyakunosuke Ogata	5 series
2018	Youkai Watch Shadowside (2018–2019)	Myouou Fudou	
2018	Full Metal Panic! Invisible Victory	Michel Lemon	
2018	Magical Girl Ore	Magical Milf Sayo (Sayori Uno)	
2018	Nobunaga no Shinobi	Suzuki Magoichi	
2018	Sirius the Jaeger	Yevgraf	
2018	Revue Starlight	Giraffe	
2018	Mr. Tonegawa: Middle Management Blues	Yūji Endou	
2018	My Hero Academia (2018–2020)	Overhaul	2 series
2018	Xuan Yuan Sword Luminary	Xiang Chu	
2018	That Time I Got Reincarnated as a Slime (2018–2019)	Vesta	
2018	Puzzle & Dragons (2018–2020)	Michael Sanada	
2018	Skull-face Bookseller Honda	Old Man Okay	
2018	Layton Mystery Tanteisha: Katori no Nazotoki File (2018–2019)	Rufus Aldebaran	
2018	Dakaichi	Romio Mitsuya	
2018	Merc Storia: Mukiryoku no Shounen to Bin no Naka no Shoujo	Ravio	
2019	W'z	Daichi Nagaoka	
2019	Pokémon Mystery Dungeon: Gates to Infinity	Narration	Introduction special movie
2019	Megido 72: Nagaki Sen Tabi no Katawara de – The short animation	Bune	
2019	Kengan Ashura	Kaolan Wongsawat	2 series
2019	Blade of the Immortal (2019–2020)	Manji	
2019	Run with the Wind	Mochidzuki	
2019	Domestic Girlfriend	Masaki Kobayashi	
2019	My Roommate is a Cat	Roku	
2019	Girly Air Force	William Shankle	
2019	Real Girl	Guesthouse head	
2019	Meiji Tokyo Renka	Rentarō Taki	
2019	Ao Can't Study!	Hanasaki Horie	
2019	Afterlost	Daichi	
2019	Sarazanmai	Chikai Kuji	
2019	Fairy gone	Griff Mercer	2 series
2019	Wise Man's Grandchild	Zest	
2019	Demon Lord, Retry!	Hakuto Kunai (Akira Ouno)	
2019	The Ones Within	Paka	
2019	Cop Craft	Kei Matoba	
2019	Fire Force (2019–2020)	Joker	2 series
2019	To the Abandoned Sacred Beasts	Arthur Allston/Behemoth	
2019	Special 7: Special Crime Investigation Unit	Shiori Ichinose	
2019	African Salaryman	Lizard, news anchor, narration	
2019	Youkai Watch!	Myouou Fudou	
2019	Outburst Dreamer Boys	Middle-aged man, swimming department manager	
2019	Stand My Heroes: PIECE OF TRUTH	Masayoshi Ida	
2019	Actors: Songs Connection	Ginjirō Nago	
2019	Case File nº221: Kabukicho	Milverton	
2020	ID:INVADED	Brilliant Detective Sakaido/Akihito Narihisago	
2020	Seton Academy: Join the Pack!	Mr. Aramoto, Don Noma, Iena's father, Mr. Kuwano, Nia Ooba, Zemo Ihara, Babari Atlas	
2020	Altered Carbon: Resleeved	Hachisuka	
2020	Sorcerous Stabber Orphen	Wall Karen	
2020	Toilet-Bound Hanako-kun	Tsuchigomori	
2020	Kedama no Gonjiro	Keshiosu	
2020	IDOLiSH7 Second Beat!	Takamasa Kujou	Also in Third Beat
2020	Tower of God	Lero-Ro	
2020	Woodpecker Detective's Office	Kodou Nomura	
2020	Dropkick on My Devil!	Naked body	
2020	Princess Connect! Re:Dive	Cockatrice's Nest owner	
2020	Boruto: Naruto Next Generations	Jigen/Isshiki Ōtsutsuki	
2020	The God of High School	Jegal Taek	
2020	Food Wars! The Fifth Plate	Don Kama	
2020	Appare-Ranman!	Richard Riesman	
2020	Jujutsu Kaisen	Kento Nanami	
2020	Ikebukuro West Gate Park	Shadow	
2020	Magatsu Wahrheit -Zuerst-	Heruman	
2021	Hortensia Saga	Maurice Baudelaire	
2021	Project Scard: Scar on the Praeter	Hræsvelgr Sakiyo	
2021	Cells at Work! Code Black	Narration	
2021	World Trigger 2nd Season	Koskero, Takumi Rindō	
2021	True Cooking Master Boy	Ensei	
2021	Horimiya	Shin Yasuda	
2021	Mushoku Tensei: Jobless Reincarnation	Orsted	
2021	The World Ends with You: The Animation	Sanae Hanekoma	
2021	To Your Eternity	The Beholder	
2021	So I'm a Spider, So What?	Merazophis	
2021	Dosukoi Sushizumou	Oyakata Nasubi	
2021	Dragon Goes House-Hunting	Varney	
2021	Life Lessons with Uramichi Oniisan	Amon	
2021	Sonny Boy	Yamabiko/Yamada Kunihiko	
2021	Fena: Pirate Princess	Maxiver Jr.	
2021	Lupin the 3rd Part 6	Albert Dandregy	
2022	Sabikui Bisco	Kurokawa	
2022	Platinum End	Gaku Yoneda	
2022	Lucifer and the Biscuit Hammer	Noi Crezant	
2022	The Prince of Tennis II: U-17 World Cup	Dodo Obando, Sadaharu Inui	
2022	Shinobi no Ittoki	Kidō Minobe	
2022	Chainsaw Man	Kishibe	
2022	To Your Eternity 2nd Season	The Beholder	
2023	Ayaka: A Story of Bonds and Wounds	Makoto Yanagi	
2023	Bungo Stray Dogs Season 5	Bram Stoker	
2023	Firefighter Daigo: Rescuer in Orange	Narrator	
2023	Jujutsu Kaisen Season 2	Kento Nanami	
2023	Ron Kamonohashi's Forbidden Deductions	Dr. Hilsh	
2024	Tsukimichi: Moonlit Fantasy 2nd Season	Shiki	
2024	Metallic Rouge	Afdal Bashal	
2024	Sengoku Youko	Yazen	
2024	Ninja Kamui	Joe Logan / Higan	
2024	The Fable	Kojima	
2024	The Idolmaster Shiny Colors	Tsutomu Amai	
2024	Brave Bang Bravern!	Ira	
2024	Tasūketsu	Hisoka Midō	
2024	Red Cat Ramen	Bunzō	
2024	Bye Bye, Earth	King Lowhide (Justice)	
2024	Blue Miburo	Nagakura Shinpachi	
2024	Demon Lord, Retry! R	Hakuto Kunai	
2024	Neko ni Tensei Shita Oji-san	Professor Itoyanagi	
2024	Orb: On the Movements of the Earth (2024–2025)	Novak	
2024	Re:Zero − Starting Life in Another World	Heinkel Astrea	
2025	Trillion Game	Kunugi	
2025	Farmagia	Diluculum	
2025	Araiguma Calcal-dan	Middle	
2025	You and Idol Pretty Cure	Kyuutaro	
2025	Apocalypse Hotel	Aggressive Alien	
2025	Tojima Wants to Be a Kamen Rider	Hachirō Nakao	
2025	Gnosia	Jonas	
2026	Scum of the Brave	Lord "Amber Thorn"	
2026	In the Clear Moonlit Dusk	Yoi's father	
2026	Iron Wok Jan	Narrator	
2026	One Piece	Figarland Shamrock	
2026	Sekiro: No Defeat	Genichiro Ashina	
2026	Firefly Wedding	Mitsueda	
2027	The Guy She Was Interested in Wasn't a Guy at All	Joe	

=== Anime films ===
Year	Title	Role(s)	Details
2004	Yu-Gi-Oh!: Pyramid of Light	Seto Kaiba	
2005	The Prince of Tennis: The Movie – The Two Samurai: The First Game	Sadaharu Inui	
2005	The Prince of Tennis: The Movie – Atobe's Gift	Sadaharu Inui	
2007	Uchū Elevator ~ Kagakusha no Yume Miru Mirai	Hideki Asanaga, narration	
2009	Chocolate Underground	Joe Crawley	
2010	Planzet	Ken Tasaki	
2011	The Prince of Tennis: The Movie – The Battle of the British City	Sadaharu Inui	
2012	TIGER & BUNNY: The Movie – The Beginning	Fire Emblem/Nathan Seymour	
2013	Toriko: The Movie – Bishokushin's Special Menu	Smile	
2013	Hakuōki: Wild Dance of Kyoto	Chikage Kazama	
2014	Inazuma Eleven: Chou Jigen Dream Match	Bitway Ozrock	
2014	K: The Movie – MISSING KINGS	Mikoto Suoh	
2014	TIGER & BUNNY: The Movie – The Rising	Fire Emblem/Nathan Seymour	
2014	Hakuōki: Warrior Spirit of the Blue Sky	Chikage Kazama	
2014	Yūto-kun ga Iku: The Movie	Commentator	
2016	GANTZ:O	Sanpei Taira	
2016	Sound! Euphonium (2016–2019)	Takuya Gotou	3 films
2016	Yu-Gi-Oh!: The Dark Side of Dimensions	Seto Kaiba	
2017	Free! Timeless Medley	Seijuro Mikoshiba	
2017	Youkai Watch Shadowside: The Movie – Oniou no Fukkatsu	Myouou Fudou	
2018	SERVAMP -Alice in the Garden-	Jeje	
2018	K SEVEN STORIES Episode 1 – R:B ~ BLAZE ~	Mikoto Suoh	
2018	K SEVEN STORIES Episode 2 – SIDE:BLUE ~ Tenrō no Gotoku ~	Gouki Zenjou	
2019	Even if the World Will End Tomorrow	Genji Hazama	
2019	Code Geass: Lelouch of the Resurrection	Swaile Qujappat	
2019	WALKING MEAT	Hasegawa	
2019	NiNoKuni	Gavalas Folgan	
2019	KonoSuba: God's Blessing on this Wonderful World! Legend of Crimson	Hans	
2021	Mobile Suit Gundam: Hathaway	Gahman Nobil	
2021	Belle	Jelinek	
2021	Inu-Oh	Inu-oh's Father	
2021	Bright: Samurai Soul	Tōmoku	
2021	Revue Starlight: The Movie	Giraffe	
2021	Sing a Bit of Harmony	Saijō	
2021	Jujutsu Kaisen 0	Kento Nanami	
2022	Ensemble Stars!! Road to Show!!	Mitsunari Samejima	
2022	One Piece Film: Red	Gordon	
2022	Break of Dawn	Yoshitatsu Kawai	
2023	Hokkyoku Hyakkaten no Concierge-san	Wally	
2024	Dead Dead Demon's Dededede Destruction	Nobuo Koyama	
2024	Detective Conan: The Million Dollar Pentagram	Hijikata Toshizō	
2024	Mononoke the Movie: Phantom in the Rain	Hokuto Mizorogi	
2024	Fureru	Kohei Shimada	
2024	Fuuto PI: The Portrait of Kamen Rider Skull	Sōkichi Narumi	
2025	100 Meters	Kaido	
2025	Scarlet	Gravedigger	
2025	Chainsaw Man – The Movie: Reze Arc	Kishibe	
2026	Paris ni Saku Étoile	Shoichi Yajima	
2026	The Keeper of the Camphor Tree	Gondo	
2026	Mobile Suit Gundam: Hathaway – The Sorcery of Nymph Circe	Gahman Nobil	
2027	Ghost	Moby Dick	

=== Original Net Animation ===
Year	Title	Role(s)	Details
2015	Ninja Slayer From Animation	Lobster	
2016	Pokémon Generations	Akagi	
2018	DEVILMAN crybaby	Koji Nagasaki	
2018	Isekai Izakaya ~ Koto Aitheria no Izakaya Nobu ~	Gernot	
2018	Baki (2018–2020)	Sikorsky	
2019	ULTRAMAN (2019–present)	Adad	
2019	7SEEDS	Ryouya Izayoi	
2019	Shoujo☆Konto All Starlight	Giraffe	
2020	Ghost in the Shell: SAC_2045 (2020–2022)	Standard	
2020	Arknights: Holy Knight Light	Emperor	
2021	The Way of the Househusband (2021–2023)	Tatsu	
2021	Super Crooks	Johnny Bolt	
2022	Thermae Romae Novae	Lucius Modestus	
2022	Cyberpunk: Edgerunners	Ripperdoc	
2022	Romantic Killer	Tsuchiya	
2023	Yakitori: Soldiers of Misfortune	Vasha Pupkin	
2023	Good Night World	Shigatera	

=== Original Video Animation ===
Year	Title	Role(s)	Details
2006	The Prince of Tennis OVA – National Tournament Edition	Sadaharu Inui	
2009	Shakugan no Shana S	"Playful Collector" Ukobach	
2011	Baka to Test to Shōkanjū: Matsuri	Shin Fukuhara, narration	
2011	Hakuōki: A Memory of Snow Flowers	Chikage Kazama	
2014	Terra Formars	God Lee	
2016	Durarara!!×2 Conclusion" Side Story!?	Shizuo Nobusuma	Episode 19.5
2017	Space Yamato 2202: Warriors of Love	Isami Enomoto	
2017	First Love Monster	Arashi Nagasawa	Tankōbon volume #8 special edition including anime DVD
2017	Landreaall	Rokkou	Comics Volume #29 limited edition
2018	Golden Kamuy (2018–2020)	Hyakunosuke Ogata	Comics/anime DVD (same package edition)
2020	ACCA: 13-Territory Inspection Dept.	Nino	
2021	Hakuoki	Chikage Kazama	

=== Dubbing ===
==== Live-action films ====
Actor	Title	Role(s)	Details
Colin Farrell	Pride and Glory	Jimmy Egan	
Colin Farrell	Crazy Heart	Tommy Sweet	
Colin Farrell	Fright Night	Jerry Dandrige	
Colin Farrell	Saving Mr. Banks	Travers Robert Goff	
Colin Farrell	Solace	Charles Ambrose	
Colin Farrell	Fantastic Beasts and Where to Find Them	Percival Graves	
Colin Farrell	The Beguiled	John McBurney	
Colin Farrell	The Gentlemen	Coach	
Armie Hammer	Mine	Mike Stevens	
Armie Hammer	Call Me by Your Name	Oliver	
Armie Hammer	Running Wild with Bear Grylls	Armie Hammer	
Armie Hammer	Crisis	Jake Kelly	
Armie Hammer	Death on the Nile	Simon Doyle	
Jamie Dornan	Once Upon a Time	Sheriff Graham Humbert/The Huntsman	
Jamie Dornan	Fifty Shades series (Fifty Shades of Grey, Fifty Shades Darker, Fifty Shades Freed)	Christian Grey	
Jamie Dornan	Robin Hood	Will Scarlet	
Jamie Dornan	Belfast	Pa	
Jamie Dornan	Heart of Stone	Parker	
Aaron Taylor-Johnson	Bullet Train	Tangerine	
Aaron Taylor-Johnson	The Fall Guy	Tom Ryder	
Aaron Taylor-Johnson	Kraven the Hunter	Sergei Kravinoff / Kraven	
Aaron Taylor-Johnson	28 Years Later	Jamie	
Richard Armitage	Strike Back	John Porter	
Richard Armitage	Hannibal	Francis Dolarhyde	Episodes 8–12
Richard Armitage	Pilgrimage	Raymond de Merville	
Adam Driver	Star Wars series (Star Wars: The Force Awakens, Star Wars: The Last Jedi, Star Wars: The Rise of Skywalker)	Kylo Ren	
Adam Driver	The Last Duel	Jacques Le Gris	

==== Film ====
Actor	Title	Role(s)	Details
Regé-Jean Page	Mortal Engines	Captain Madzimoyo Khora	
Olivier Martinez	Unfaithful	Paul Martel	Morning television edition
Desmond Harrington	Exit Speed	Sam Cutter	
Édgar Ramírez	Point Break	Bodhi	
JJ Feild	Not Safe For Work	Killer	
Donnie Yen	The Lost Bladesman	Guan Yu	
Steven Strait	10,000 BC	D'Leh	2011 TV Asahi edition
Barkhad Abdi	Captain Phillips	Abduwali Muse	
Christopher Abbott	Criminal Activities	Warren	
Édgar Ramírez	Gold	Michael Acosta	
Chang Chen	Sound of Color	John Chan	
Luke Evans	The Three Musketeers	Aramis	Theater release edition
Matt Dillon	Going in Style	Special Agent Arlen Hamer	
Aaron Eckhart	No Reservations	Nick Palmer	
Alan Ladd	Shane	Shane	New Era Movies (N.E.M.) version
Andy Whitfield	Gabriel	Gabriel	
Matt McColm	Cellular	Deason	Morning television edition
Francesco Montagna	My House is Full of Mirrors: Sophia Loren	Franco	
Jesse Metcalfe	Insanitarium	Jack	
Cole Hauser	Tortured	Agent Kevin Cole/Jimmy Vaughn	
Matthew Maccaull	Tomorrowland	Dave Clark	
John Stockwell	Top Gun	LT Bill "Cougar" Cortell	Software edition
Luke Evans	No One Lives	Driver	
Matthew Marsden	Resident Evil: Extinction	Alexander Slater	Morning television edition
Paul Bettany	Firewall	Bill Cox	Morning television edition
Enzo Cilenti	The Fourth Kind	Scott Stracinsky	
Michael B. Jordan	Black Panther	Erik "Killmonger" Stevens/N'Jadaka	
Michael B. Jordan	Black Panther: Wakanda Forever	Erik "Killmonger" Stevens/N'Jadaka	
Josh Duhamel	Misconduct	Ben Cahill	
Zack Ward	BloodRayne 2: Deliverance	Billy the Kid	
Pilou Asbæk	Ben-Hur (2016)	Pontius Pilate	
Karl Urban	The Bourne Supremacy	Kirill	Japan television edition
Gabriel Macht	Whiteout (2009)	Robert Pryce	
Dustin Nguyen	Zero Tolerance	Johnny	
Thomas Wlaschiha	The Cloud	Hannes, nuclear power plant official, schoolteacher, vigilant police officer	Only voice for nuclear power plant official
Sam Hazeldine	Mechanic: Resurrection	Riah Crain	
Bill Hader	Men in Black 3	Andy Warhol/Agent W	
Brian Presley	Home of the Brave	Specialist Tommy Yates	
Matthias Schoenaerts	The Danish Girl	Hans Axgil (Fernando Porta)	
Taye Diggs	Rent	Benjamin "Benny" Coffin, III	Netflix edition
Kid Cudi (Scott Mescudi)	Vincent N Roxxy	Suga	
Angus Sutherland	Lost Boys: The Tribe	Shane	
Shiloh Fernandez	Edge of Winter	Richard	
Alexander Skarsgård	Godzilla vs. Kong	Dr. Nathan Lind	
Juan Diego Botto	The Suicide Squad	Silvio Luna	
Don Cheadle	Space Jam: A New Legacy	Al-G Rhythm	
Chang Chen	Dune	Dr. Wellington Yueh	
Tadanobu Asano	Mortal Kombat	Lord Raiden	
Tadanobu Asano	Mortal Kombat II	Lord Raiden	
Cillian Murphy	Anna	Leonard Miller	
Neil Patrick Harris	The Matrix Resurrections	The Analyst	
Tony Leung Chiu-wai	Happy Together	Lai Yiu-fai	
Esai Morales	Mission: Impossible – Dead Reckoning Part One	Gabriel	
Esai Morales	Mission: Impossible – The Final Reckoning	Gabriel	
Christopher Rydell	Trauma	David Parsons	Crowdfunded dub
Tom Burke	Furiosa: A Mad Max Saga	Praetorian Jack	
Zachary Ruane	Dungeons & Dragons: Honor Among Thieves	Sven Salafin	
Jon Stewart	IF	Robot	
Randall Park	Strays	Hunter	
Michael Kelly	Transformers: Rise of the Beasts	Agent Burke	
Glen Powell	Twisters	Tyler Owens	
Alexander Skarsgård	The Northman	Amleth	
Anthony Carrigan	Superman	Rex Mason / Metamorpho	

==== Dramas ====
Actor	Title	Role(s)	Details
Jeffrey Pierce	Alcatraz	Jack Sylvane	
Will McCormack	Alphas	Marcus Ayers	
Jamie Jackson; Stewart J. Zully	Unforgettable	Victor; Theodore Muscat	Episode 9
Matt Dillon	Wayward Pines	Ethan Burke	
Oliver Jackson-Cohen	Emerald City	Roan/Lucas	
Jilon VanOver	Cold Case	Truitt "Spider" Leland	Episode 13
Scoot McNairy	Godless	Bill McNue	
Toby Leonard Moore	The Pacific	Sergeant (2nd Lieutenant) Stone	
Joshua Dallas	CSI: Crime Scene Investigation (season 11)	Kip Woodman	Episode 15
Josh Randall	CSI: Crime Scene Investigation (season 13)	NTSB investigator Doug Wilson	Episode 10
Anthony Ruivivar	Frequency	Captain Stan Moreno	
Ferdinand Kingsley	Victoria	Francatelli (2017)	
Misha Collins	Supernatural	Castiel (angel)	
Matt Buschell	Scorpion	The Gooch	Season 4 episode 15
Jim Watson	The Strain	Young Abraham Setrakian	
Robert Kazinsky	Second Chance	Jimmy Pritchard	
Phillip Choi	Soulmate (2006)	Phillip	
Misha Collins	Timeless	Eliot Ness – episode 15	
Haaz Sleiman	Nurse Jackie	Mohammed "Mo-Mo" De La Cruz	
C. J. Thomason	Harper's Island	Jimmy Mance	
Gonzalo Menendez	Burn Notice	Lucio Velasquez	
Adam Rayner	Hunted	Aidan Marsh	
Daniel Sunjata	Lie to me*	Andrew Jenkins	
Alex Solowitz, Zachary Stockdale	Rush Hour	Dennis, Chad	Episode 4
Clayne Crawford	Lethal Weapon	Martin Riggs	
Matthew Le Nevez	Absentia	Cal Isaac	
Hugo Becker	Leonardo	Thierry	
Jonathan Tucker	Debris	Bryan Beneventi	
Michael Aloni	Scenes from a Marriage	Poli	
Matt Smith	House of the Dragon	Prince Daemon Targaryen	
Colin Morgan	The Killing Kind	John Webster	
Jonathan Tucker	City on a Hill	Francis "Frankie" Ryan	

==== Animation ====
Title	Role(s)	Details
Megamind	Bernard	
What If...?	Killmonger	
Puss in Boots: The Last Wish	Wolf/Death	
Mechamato Movie	Grakakus	
We Bare Bears: The Movie	Agent Trout	
The Lord of the Rings: The War of the Rohirrim	Wulf	

=== Stage (theatre) ===
Date(s)	Stage performance	Role(s)	Details
1998	Shuntoku Maru	n/a	
October 2003	OH!BABY	K	
December 22–29, 2004	Kakumei no Ringo	Ogasawara master	
September 2005	Dog-Eat-Dog	Makoto Tsuda	
February 2006	tatsuya Saiai Naru Mono no Gawa e	Hashimoto Tatsuya	
September 2006	Ochii Hito – Dopondo	Iago	
January 2007	Air Gear Musical	Spitfire	
February 2007	MIKOSHI ~ Utsukushii Kokyū e	Wakabayashi (beginning)	
May 2007	Air Gear Musical vs. Bacchus Super Range Remix	Spitfire	
August 25, 2007	Kujou no Tegami	Recitation	
September 2007	STONES	Kano	
January 2008	RUN&GUN Stage "Blue Sheets"	Director Kuramoto	
May 2008	Kamisori	Souta Noguchi (village office clerk)	
September 2008	Yurayura	Miyada (psychiatrist assistant)	
November 2008, November 2009, August 2010, May–June 2011, October 2011, November–December 2012	Magdala Maria series (Maria's Mad Apple Tea Party; Maria Almost Dies a Second Time! Rushing to Oriental Sunshine Murder Case; Maria's Dream Unfolds at Night and the Like! The Foolish Devil Hadaka Takuo Finally Opening a New Shop; Maria's Mad (Apple) Tea Party (Reprise!); The Foolish Devil Hadaka Takuo – Colors of Love Uproar; Wine and Tango and a Man and a Woman and Wine)	Grace	
December 3–7, 2008	Linda Linda Rubber Sole	Tsunami	
April 2010	Memories of Matsuko	Takeo Okano	
October 20–31, 2010	HYSTERIC D BAND First Public Production "Rules of Kosa Nostra"	Hart	
April–May 2012	WBB Playstar volume 2	n/a	
February 2013	3150 Manbyou to, Sukoshi	n/a	
June 2013	Finest Literature Part #4 "In a Grove" Theater of Gathered Actors	Tajoumaru	Read-aloud drama
August 2013	GEKIDO	Akira Tsuda (young novelist)	
November 2013	The Foreign Female Grace	Grace	"Magdala Maria" alternative performance
April 18 – May 6, 2014	Teiichi: Battle of Supreme High	Keigo Douyama	
February 21 – March 1, 2015	Kanata Presents "Abuna E Aburi Goe ~ Miyuki"	Narration	Read-aloud drama
July 12–26, 2015	Teiichi: Battle of Supreme High – Mime, Mime of the Playoffs -	Keigo Douyama	Second chapter
September 12, 2015; October 14, 2017; October 28, 2018; September 6, 2020, and August 27, 2022	AD-LIVE (Ad-Lib) Project	n/a	Parthenon Tama; Mielparque Ōsaka
February 24–28, 2016	Them Shouting Them Shouting, This Night's Horizon	Akiwo	
March 11 & 13, 2016	A Drama Reading Series by Actors with Outstanding Voices "Sorekara"	n/a	Kiinokuniya Southern Theater
June 30 – July 31, 2016	Legend of Funassyi – DMM VR Theater	Dorage (voice acting)	
July 24, 2016; April 22–23, 2017	Sora Yuzu Voices Planetarium Public Reading	Hoshi (voice)	Children's Culture and Sports Center Dream 21 – Higashiōsaka; Sendai Astronomical Observatory – Hitachi Civic Center
February 16, 2017	A Drama Reading Series by Actors with Outstanding Voices "Kokoro"	n/a	Panasonic Globe Theatre
July 23, 2017	"Diviner" – Fuji, Koiseba Hen (Rikkoukai Hall)	Seimei Abe	Read-aloud drama
August 31, 2017	VOICARION II Ghost Club (Hibiya Theater Creation)	Harry Houdini	Read-aloud musical drama
September 22–24, 2017; January 6–8, 2018; October 13–21, 2018	Revue Starlight – The LIVE – #1; The LIVE – #1 Revival; The LIVE – #2 Transition	Giraffe (voice acting)	AiiA 2.5 Theater Tokyo; AiiA 2.5 Theater Tokyo); Ten'nozu Galaxy Theater
January 12–13, 2019	READING HIGH "Chevre Note Story from Jeanne d'Arc"	Charles VII	Read-aloud drama

=== Television dramas ===
Date(s)	Title	Role(s)	Details
2000	Natsuhiko Kyougoku's "Mystery"	Kai Hagino	Episode 1 "Cape of Seven People"; from The Wicked and the Damned: A Hundred Tales of Karma
2000	Multiple Personality Detective Psycho	n/a	
2000	Ikebukuro West Gate Park	Host Akira	Episode 8
2000	Nagai Yume	Dr. Yamauchi	
2001	Handoku!!!	Publishing editor	Episode 3
2004	Hito ga Satsui wo Idaku Toki	Toshiya Tsutsumi	
2005	Ano Ko ga Hoshii	n/a	
2005	Boys Over Flowers	n/a	In episode 2
2007	Seven Days of a Daddy and a Daughter	Nomura (teacher)	
2008	Sasaki Fusai no Jingi Naki Tatakai	n/a	In episode 2
2008	Daisuki!!	Physician	Episode 1
2008	Daisuki! Itsutsugo	Nakazawa	
2008	Tokyo Girl	Yukio	
2008	Torihada 4: Yofukashi no Anata ni Zotto Suru Hanashi wo	Kenji Kawamura	Episode 3 "Ikisugiru Aijou no Kiroku"
2009	Saru Lock	Kimura (art teacher)	
2009	Jin	Physician	Episode 1
2010	Arienai!	Agari	Episode 4
2010	Naze Kimi wa Zetsubou to Tatakaeta no ka	Lawyer	
2011	CO Transplant Coordinator	Inui (lawyer)	
2019	Koyoi, Afureko Booth de	Himself	Wowow Online, dTV, FOD, AbemaTV Hoka
2020	Yell	Inui	Asadora
2020	The Way of the Househusband	Narrator	Episode 4
2021	The Ingenuity of the Househusband	Himself	
2021	Dearest	Atsushi Yamao	
2022	Is My Kawaii About to Expire?	Shūhei Sudō	
2022	Nanba MG5	Matsu Nanba (voice)	
2022	Anata no Butsu ga, Koko ni	Kōzō Takeda	
2022	The Old Dog, New Tricks?	Yabe	
2022	The Black Swindler	Takaya Usami	Episode 8
2023	Reversal Orchestra	Yūichi Motomiya	
2023	The Last Man: The Blind Profiler	Kunio Kamata	
2023	Trillion Game	Kunugi	
2023	Ōoku: The Inner Chambers	Ii Naosuke	
2023	Uchi no Bengoshi wa Te ga Kakaru	Ichiro Aso	Episode 6
2024	Aibou Season 22	Mysterious consulate official (voice)	Episode 10
2024	Great Gift	Hiromitsu Gunji	
2024	Blue Moment	Masaki Hoshina (voice)	Episode 7
2024	Saionji-san wa Kaji wo Shinai	Kazuto Yokoi	
2024	Golden Kamuy: The Hunt of Prisoners in Hokkaido	Narrator	
2025	1995: Tokyo Subway Sarin Attack	Tatsuhiko Tsurugi	Lead role; television film
2025	Anpan	Akira Shoji	Asadora
2025	The 19th Medical Chart	Yoshikazu Hotta	Episode 3
2025	Passing the Reins	Tsuneaki Taira	
2025	Unbound	Kyokutei Bakin	Taiga drama
2026	Soda Master	Kisuke "Kam-bo" Kikuhara	Lead role
2026	The Nurse X	Daigoro Kanbe	
2027	The Silent Service	Jun Otaki	Season 2

=== Film ===
Year	Title	Role(s)	Details
1995	Kimi wo Wasurenai	n/a	
2000	Yi Yi	n/a	
2000	Oshikiri	Man	
2001	Chloe	n/a	
2002	Suicide Club	Mita (anatomical doctor assistant)	
2002	Dog star	Hagio Fujikawa	
2003	Spy Sorge	News cameraman	
2003	IKKA	n/a	
2004	Dragon City	n/a	
2005	Irasshaimase, Kanja-sama	Paramedic	
2008	Chiisana Koi no Monogatari	n/a	
2009	Hagetaka	Sakamoto (Stanley Brothers corporate representative)	
2019	Documentertainment AD-LIVE	Performer, screenwriter, director	
2022	Tell Me	Kashima	
2022	Shin Ultraman	Alien Zarab (voice)	
2023	Ichikei's Crow: The Movie	Hideaki Shimatani	
2023	As Long as We Both Shall Live	Norio Kamomura	
2024	My Home Hero: The Movie	Shino	
2024	Golden Kamuy	Narrator	
2024	The Yin Yang Master Zero	Narrator	
2024	Honeko Akabane's Bodyguards	Takeo Ibuki	
2025	Trillion Game	Kunugi	
2025	Under Ninja	UN (voice)	
2025	True Beauty: Before	Takao Kanda	
2025	True Beauty: After	Takao Kanda	
2025	Blank Canvas: My So-Called Artist's Journey	Oka	
2025	Candle Stick	Isao	Taiwanese-Japanese film
2025	Love on Trial	Koichi Yoshida	
2025	The Silent Service: Battle of the Arctic Ocean	Jun Otaki	
2025	Romantic Killer	Narrator	
2026	Sakamoto Days	Asakura	
2026	Tokyo MER: Mobile Emergency Room – Capital Crisis	Kazumi Shiba	
2026	Bayside Shakedown N.E.W.	Deputy Commissioner-General	

=== Original videos ===
Year	Title	Role(s)	Details
1999	Jurougumo	Detective Katagiri	
2000	Totemo Yasashii Rinjintachi	n/a	Fin de siècle horror drama
2001	Toriko: Kyoku Tsuma no Sei	Keiichi Yajima	
2002	Hitodzuma Shokeijin R mission 1 Chinurareta Misao	Iwasai	
2005	Bakeneko Makai Shoujoken	n/a	

=== Video games ===
Year	Title	Role(s)	Details
2002	Prince of Tennis series	Sadaharu Inui	
2003	Yu-Gi-Oh! Duel Monsters 8: Great Evil God	Seto Kaiba	
2005	Armored Core: Last Raven	Jack-O	
2005	Kenka Banchou	Youhei Kikunaga	
2005	NANA	Yasushi Takagi	
2006	Enchanted Arms	Raigar	
2006	Korokoro Ichiban! Extra #7 "Korokoro Ichiban! Deluxe Game & Adventure Battle DVD"	Village headman, narration	
2006	Korokoro Ichiban! Extra #11 "Korokoro Ichiban! Wazabo – Quiz Game – DVD"	Village headman, narration	
2006	Jiritsu Kidou Sensha Idzuna	Tsuneto Soga	
2006	Ninkyouden: Toseinin Ichidaiki	Mataemon Nakagawa	
2006	Meine Liebe II ~ Pride and Justice and Love ~	Wolfram	
2006	Love Com ~ Punch DE Tale	Heikichi Nakao	
2007	REBORN! series (2007–2010)	Lambo (adult), Spanner	5 productions (Note: "Shinu Ki MAX! Vongola Carnival!!" & "Flame Rumble Kaien Ring Soudatsusen!" (2007), "Flame Rumble Chou ~ Moeyo Mirai" (2008), "Flame Rumble X ~ Mirai Chou Bakuhatsu" (2009), "Flame Rumble XX – Kessen! Shin 6 Chouka" (2010))
2007	Ace Attorney 4: Promotion Eizou	Kirihito Garyū	
2007	Kenka Banchou 2: Full Throttle	Youhei Kikunaga	
2008	Akai Ito DS	Sakai	
2008	Soul Eater: Plot of Medusa	Mifune	
2008	Soulcalibur IV	Maxi	
2008	Sora Yume	Isshin Misakubo	
2008	Tales of Hearts	Chrino-Seraph	
2008	Hakuōki: Shinsengumi Kitan	Chikage Kazama	
2008	Yu-Gi-Oh! Duel Terminal	Seto Kaiba	
2008	Real Rode	Devil Liberius	
2009	Kanuchi: Kuroki Tsubasa no Shou	Kasuga Kisena	
2009	Saikin Koi Shiteru?	Yūsuke Saeki	
2009	Soul Eater: Battle Resonance	Mifune	
2009	Soulcalibur: Broken Destiny	Maxi	
2009	Sora Yume portable	Isshin Misakubo	
2009	Hakuōki: Zuisouroku	Chikage Kazama	
2009	Beyblade: Metal Fusion | Gachinko Stadium	Ryūga	
2009	Beyblade: Metal Fusion | Cyber Pegasus	Ryūga	
2010	Ishin Koika Ryūme Gaiden	Isami Kondou	
2010	Kanuchi: Futatsu no Tsubasa	Kasuga Kisena	
2010	TAKUYO Mix Box ~ First Anniversary ~	Isshin Misakubo	
2010	Desert Kingdom	Ishmar Yahhave	
2010	Nise no Chigiri	Suien	
2010	Hakuoki: Yūgi Roku	Chikage Kazama	
2010	Hakuoki: Junsouroku	Chikage Kazama	
2010	Hakuoki: Reimeiroku	Chikage Kazama	
2010	Beyblade: Metal Fusion | Bakushin Susanow Attacks!	Ryūga	
2010	Beyblade: Metal Fusion | Chouzetsu Tensei Vulcan Horuseus	Ryūga	
2010	Beyblade: Metal Fusion | Choujou Kessen! Big Bang Bladers	Ryūga	
2011	Hyperdimension Neptunia mk2	Judge The Hard	
2011	Shin Megami Tensei: Devil Survivor	Yasuyuki Honda	
2011	DUNAMIS15	Issaku Kudou	
2011	Nise no Chigiri: Omoide no Saki e	Suien	
2011	BEYOND THE FUTURE – FIX THE TIME ARROWS -	Roguna-	
2012	Mugen Souls	Shirogane	
2012	SD Gundam G Generation series (2012–2019)	Kratz Silvy (OVER WORLD-), Brand Freeze (OVER WORLD-), My Character Voice Youth (OVER WORLD)	3 productions
2012	Mobile Suit Gundam AGE	Dole Frost	
2012	GENROH	Benkei Musashibou	
2012	24 Toki no Kane to Cinderella ~ Halloween Wedding ~	Oswell-Savalet	
2012	Hakuōki: Bakumatsu Musouroku	Chikage Kazama	
2012	Hakuōki: Yūgiroku Ni – Matsuri Hayashi to Taishitachi	Chikage Kazama	
2013	Assassin's Creed IV: Black Flag	Edward Kenway	
2013	Mugen Souls Z	Shirogane	
2013	Issho ni Gohan. PORTABLE	Natsu Daitou	
2013	Inazuma Eleven GO: Galaxy	Bitway Ozrock, Stag Kwatta	
2013	Liberation Maiden SIN	Mutsumi Azama	
2013	Chaos Heroes Online	Chan	
2013	Kaseifu-san! ~ Tokimeku☆Ikemen Danshi Ryou ~	Atsushi Genda	
2013	Jewelic Nightmare	Lord Carmina	
2013	Soukyū no Sky Galleon	Zeus/Jupiter	
2013	TIGER & BUNNY ~ HERO'S DAY ~	Fire Emblem/Nathan Seymour	
2013	Taishou Kyūketsu Ibun	Gai Touya	
2013	Tale of Hearts R	Clinoseraph	
2013	Desert Kingdom Portable	Ishmar Yahhave	
2013	Dragon's Crown	Fighter	
2013	MIND≒0	Tougetsu Saionji	
2013	0 Toki no Kane to Cinderella ~ Halloween Wedding ~	Oswell-Savalet	
2014	Gakuen K: Wonderful School Days	Mikoto Suoh	
2014	CV ~ Casting Voice ~	Chitose Tokitou	
2014	Granblue Fantasy	Ezecrain	
2014	Kuro Yuki Hime ~ Snow Black ~	Louvian-Tandur	
2014	Kuro Yuki Hime ~ Snow Magic ~	Louvian-Tandur	
2014	Hyperdimension Neptunia Re;Birth2 SISTERS GENERATION	Judge The Hard	
2014	Rage of Bahamut	Kaisar	
2014	BinaryStar	Asagiri Ayumi	
2014	Hakuōki SSL ~ sweet school life ~	Chikage Kazama	
2014	MARGINAL#4 IDOL OF SUPERNOVA	Satsuki Chang	
2014	Yome Collection	Chikage Kazama	
2014	Watashi no Host-chan S	Hitoshi Kiritani	
2015	Arcadia no Aoki Fujo	n/a	
2015	Yu-Gi-Oh! Arc-V Tag Force Special	Seto Kaiba	
2015	Hortensia Saga: Ao no Kishidan	Maurice Baudelaire, Gilbert, Jamal	
2015	Gakuen K: Wonderful School Days – V Edition	Mikoto Suoh	
2015	Cafe Cuillere	Kyouhei Nagase	
2015	Grand Kingdom	Graham Berngarde	
2015	Black Desert Online	Ninja	
2015	White Cat Project	Garea Arisui	
2015	Senran no Samurai Kingdom	Masamune Date	
2015	The Great Ace Attorney: Adventures	Barok van Zieks	
2015	Teikoku Kaleido – Banka no Kakumei -	Soushi Amazaki	
2015	Tales of Zestiria	Zaveid	
2015	Tokyo Otome Restaurant	Albus Pierre Hine	
2015	Touken Ranbu	Nihongou	
2015	Dragon Quest VIII: Journey of the Cursed King	Dragon God Sovereign	
2015	Hakuōki: Shinkai – Kaze no Shou	Chikage Kazama	
2015	Hakuōki: Zuisouroku – Omokagebana	Chikage Kazama	
2015	Valiant Knights	Fried Schneider	
2015	BELIEVER!	Maddo	
2015	Yunohana SpRING!	Umenosuke Kaga	
2015	100 Sleeping Princes and the Kingdom of Dreams	Kamiro	
2015	Rampage Land Rankers	William Shakespeare	
2016	UPPERS	Kaiji Kujou	
2016	IDOLiSH7	Takamasa Kujou	
2016	Icchibanketsu -ONLINE-	Hikaru Genji	
2016	Phantom Nocturne	Kowloon Shen	
2016	THE GOD OF HIGH SCHOOL	Gakuto Saionji	
2016	Shadowverse	Forest Giant, Imperial Dragon, Emperor Khaiza	
2016	Shin Megami Tensei IV: Apocalypse – FINAL	Krishna/Vishnu-Flynn	
2016	DANCE TRIPS	Akihito Kiritani	
2016	Tales of Berseria	Zaveid	
2016	Arukurusu of Ten	Gedort Ketza	
2016	HalfBlood – Kyoukai de yureru Koi -	Tsukasa Fuwa	
2016	Yu-Gi-Oh! Duel Links	Seto Kaiba	
2016	Hakuōki: Edo Blossoms	Chikage Kazama	
2016	VALKYRIE ANATOMIA -THE ORIGIN-	Thor the Thunder God	
2016	Hyakka Hyakurō ~ Sengoku Ninpōchō ~	Hattori Hanzō	
2016	Plastic Memories	Yasutaka Hanada	
2016	Magical Days the Brats' Parade	Iori	
2016	YAMATO Chronicle SouSei	Ninigi	
2016	Yu-Gi-Oh! Duel Monsters Saikyou Card Battle	Seto Kaiba	
2016	Lego Star Wars: The Force Awakens	Kylo Ren	
2017	Reciting With You in the Glowing Red World	Toshizou Hijikata	
2017	Q&Q Answers	Genes	
2017	Ensemble Stars!	Raviol	
2017	Ikemen Vampire Ijintachi to Koi no Yūwaku	Leonardo da Vinci	
2017	Implosion: Never Lose Hope	Jonathan	
2017	Endride -X fragments-	Viper	
2017	OCCULTIC;NINE	Kouhei Izumi	
2017	Girlfriend (Kari)	Ikuo Akuno	
2017	Kingdom Hearts HD 2.8 Final Chapter Prologue	Luxu	
2017	Tales of the Rays	Zaveid	
2017	Crank In	Yohei Kawachi	
2017	Kurokishi to Shiro no Maou	Bahamut	
2017	Cronos Age	Ahab	
2017	Side Kicks!	Tatewaki	
2017	Star Wars Battlefront II	Kylo Ren	
2017	Xenoblade Chronicles 2	Zeke von Genbu	
2017	The Great Ace Attorney 2: Resolve	Barok van Zieks	
2017	Tiny Metal	Isoroku Tsukumo	
2017	Destiny Child	Thanatos	
2017	The Witch and the Hundred Knight 2	Funinmugin	
2017	Megido 72	Bune	
2018	Attack on Titan 2	Hannes	
2018	Alternate Jake Hunter: Daedalus The Awakening of Golden Jazz	Joshua	
2018	Quiz RPG: The World of Mystic Wiz	Knox Vanitas	
2018	The Idolmaster Shiny Colors	Tsutomu Amai	
2018	Full Metal Panic!	Michel Lemon	
2018	Dragalia Lost	Mikoto	
2018	Dragon's Crown PRO	Fighter	
2018	Fate/Grand Order	Sigurd	
2018	Revue Starlight – Re LIVE -	Giraffe	
2018	Libra of Precatus	Dieter Zechs	
2018	Ingress Prime	JARVIS	
2018	Underground Symphony	Greed	
2018	DAEDALUS: The Awakening of Golden Jazz	Joshua	
2018	Dragon Quest Builders 2	Sidoh/Malroth (human)	
2019	Arc of Alchemist	Jester Silverhawk	
2019	Atelier Lulua: The Scion of Arland	Benon Armster	
2019	SEKIRO: SHADOWS DIE TWICE	Genichirō Ashina	
2019	Tales of the Rays: Fairy's Requiem	Zaveid	
2019	Bleach: Brave Souls	Tokinada Tsunayashiro	
2019	JUMP FORCE	Seto Kaiba	Downloadable content (DLC) additional character
2019	Shin Megami Tensei: Liberation Dx2	Vince/Carbon Black	
2019	Pokémon Masters	Kuchinashi	
2019	Romance of the Three Kingdoms XIV	Cao Cao	
2019	Alice Closet	Java Wock	
2019	Blackstar – Theater Starless -	Sin	
2019	Song of Time – Shūen Naki Sonata	Moku	
2019	Fire Emblem Heroes (2019–2020)	Gerik, Rath	
2019	Epic Seven	Zeno	
2019	Saint Seiya: Awakening	Pisces Aphrodite	
2019	Death Stranding	Sam Porter Bridges	
2019	Days Gone	Mark Copeland	
2019	THE iDOLM@STER SideM	Zaveid	
2020	Sanctus Senki – GYEE -	Ranmaru, Brian	
2020	KonoSuba: God's Blessing on this Wonderful World! Fantastic Days	Hans	
2020	ONE-PUNCH MAN: A HERO NOBODY KNOWS	Atomic Samurai	
2020	My Hero Academia: One's Justice 2	Kai Chisaki / Overhaul	
2020	ONE PIECE: Pirate Warriors 4	Vinsmoke Yonji	
2020	Time Refrain – Ichijun go no Sekai -	Dogra	
2020	Piofiore no Banshou – Episodio1926 -	Yuan	
2020	HELIOS Rising Heroes	Keith Max	
2020	Engage Souls	Vincent	
2020	Megami Historia	Hades, clown	
2020	Dragon Quest Rivals	Sidoh (young)	
2020	Sangokushi Hadou	Lu Bu	
2020	Another Eden	Hardy	
2020	Tales of Crestoria	Zaveid	
2020	Genshin Impact	Dainsleif	
2020	Fairy Tail	Silver Fullbuster	
2020	The King of Fighters for Girls	Ryuji Yamazaki	
2020	Tale of Food	Lóngjǐng Xiārén	
2021	Shin Megami Tensei V	Hayao Koshimizu	
2021	Alchemy Stars	Faust	
2021	Cookie Run: Kingdom	Almond Cookie	
2021	Alice in the Country of Spades ~ Wonderful White World / Wonderful Black World ~	Lewis-Carroll	
2021	Dream Meister and the Recollected Black Fairy	Victor	
2021	Umamusume: Pretty Derby	Narrator (Chapter 3)	
2021	Phantasy Star Online 2: New Genesis	Glen	
2021	Samurai Warriors 5	Sandayū Momochi	
2021	Tsukihime -A piece of blue glass moon-	Vlov Arkhangel	
2021	MELTY BLOOD: TYPE LUMINA	Vlov Arkhangel	
2021	Girls' Frontline	Berezovich Kryuger	
2022	Stranger of Paradise: Final Fantasy Origin	Jack Garland	
2022	Anonymous;Code	Ewan Okuda	
2022	Fullmetal Alchemist Mobile	Maes Hughes	
2022	Yu-Gi-Oh! Cross Duel	Seto Kaiba	
2022	Eve: Ghost Enemies	Kouichirou Horido	
2022	The Diofield Chronicle	William Hende	
2022	Valkyrie Elysium	Odin	
2022	LINE Chef	Tatsu	
2023	Fire Emblem Engage	Gris, Gregory	
2023	Granblue Fantasy: Relink	Id	
2023	Resident Evil 4	Luis Sera	
2023	Higan: Eruthyll	Aron	
2023	Master Detective Archives: Rain Code	Shachi	
2023	Tower of God: New World	Lero Ro	
2023	Final Fantasy VII: Ever Crisis	Dyne	
2023	Granblue Fantasy Versus: Rising	Id	
2024	Jujutsu Kaisen: Cursed Clash	Kento Nanami	
2024	Granblue Fantasy: Relink	Id	
2024	Final Fantasy VII Rebirth	Dyne	
2024	Shin Megami Tensei V: Vengeance	Hayao Koshimizu	
2024	CalorieMate Liquid for Game Creators	Café au lait	
2024	Farmagia	Diluculum	
2025	Death Stranding 2: On the Beach	Sam Porter Bridges	
2026	Ace Combat 8: Wings of Theve	Jan Cope	

=== Drama CDs ===
Year	Title	Role(s)	Details
2012	Etrian Odyssey IV: Legends of the Titan Drama CD: ~ The Three Siblings & the Captive Medium ~	Whirlwind	
2012	Anata wo Misshitsu de Torishibe CD Daiichidan ~ Keijika Kasai Keisuke Hen ~	Kasai Keisuke	
2012	Kurayami Gatari ~ Youen Ibun ~	Rokujou Shin'ya	
2013	Hitoriijime Shiriizu CD vol. 4 Tozasareta Erebeetaa no Naka de... Buchou Ichijou Touji Hen	Ichijou Touji	
2013	Kindan Banpaia ~ Kurobara no Koutei ~	Alexander von Weiseheldenburg	
2013	Isshoni Daietto CD Vol. 4 Kintore		
2013	Kurayami Gatari ~ Yūen Ichimu ~	Rokujou Shin'ya	
2014	Soine Hitsuji CD Bangaihen Vol.1 Tsukihiko	Tsukihiko	
2014	Hajimete no Yoru	Suzuki Seijirou	
2014	Kareshi ga IchaRabu wo Kyouyoushite Nichiyoubi Beddo kara Dashitekuremasen! Vol.2 Yuusuke	Yuusuke	
2014	Amamakura Nikki Hajime	Makura Hajime	
2014	Kurayami Gatari ~ Seien Sūki ~	Rokujou Shin'ya	
2014	Onee CD ~ Tonari no Sewayaki/Kaori-chan ~	Aisawa Kaoru	
2014	Ore ni Kimeta! Hiroaki no Kakugo.	Hiroaki	
2014	Drama CD Toubousha ~ Jirō Hen ~	Jirou	
2015	My Way Job Life – Hiiragi Tomoya –	Hiiragi Tomoya	
2015	Abunae Aburigoe ~ Miyuki ~	Storyteller	
2016	Mimi ga Uruou, Kiku Supa CD – Shiaboisu Komorebi – Vol 2- Samii	Samii	
2016	Wakidenai ~ Roku no Maki Kannagi ~	Kannagi	
2018	Dareka Kono Joukyou wo Setsumeishitekudasai! ~ Keiyaku Kara Hajimatta Futari no Sonogo ~	Bellis	
2018	CHIME OUT Lesson 4 Hokenshitsu no Sensei	Touru	
2019	Wakeaji Rojouhan Room 6 Motoyan x Kanrinin	Shishimine Aoi	
2019	Satsukare CD #02 ~ Gou & Keiraku Hen ~	Gou Ryouzaki	
2019	Urashima Sakatasen 2nd Single "Ashita he no Bye Bye" Special CD – "Voice Drama 'Moeru! Supokon ★ Urashima Sakatasen'"	Himself (special guest)	
2019	Fate/Prototype: Aoi Gin no Fragments – Drama CD & Original Soundtrack Volume #5	Sigurd	
2019	Ikemen Banpaia – Ijintachi to Koi no Yūwaku Situation CD ~ Leonardo da Vinci Hen ~	Leonardo da Vinci	
2019	Brother and Brother 2	Touru	
2020	Kusuriya no Hitorigoto *Book volume #9 including special drama CD	Gao Shun	
2020	Love on Ride ~ Tsūkin Kareshi Vol.14 Tsukijō Shin'ya	Tsukijou Shin'ya	
2024	The Guy She Was Interested in Wasn't a Guy at All	Joe	

=== Digital comics ===
Title	Role(s)
Voice comic (VOMIC) Toriko	Tom
Voice comic (VOMIC) The Prince of After School	Sadaharu Inui

=== Tokusatsu ===
Year	Title	Role(s)	Details
2007	Kamen Rider Den-O	Oct Imagin (voice)	
2014	Kamen Rider Gaim	Redyue (voice)	
2014	Kamen Rider Gaim: Great Soccer Battle! Golden Fruits Cup!	Redyue (voice)	
2016	Doubutsu Sentai Zyuohger	Kilmench (voice)	
2018	Kamen Rider Zi-O	Kasshin (voice)	
2020	Kamen Rider Zi-O NEXT TIME: Geiz Majesty	Kasshin (voice)	
2021	Kamen Rider Revice	Demons Driver, Vail Driver & Kuwagata Vistamp (voice), Vail (voice)	

=== Narration ===
Year(s)	Title	Details
n/a	Dotch Cooking Show	Sapporo Breweries CM segment (within TV program)
n/a	Death Makeup	BS (broadcast for the Satellaview modem wia the Japanese Broadcasting Satellite system) for Fuji TV
n/a	TKO Golden Theater	n/a
n/a	Bon'nouji	Narration, Sanada
2004	Yu-Gi-Oh! The Movie	Special just before public announcement
March 29, 2016	Black Universe ~ A Special Night Embracing in the Universe	NHK General TV
April 29, 2017	Europe Black Cat Travel Literature	NHK BS premium
n/a	Hitachi Sekai Fushigi Hakken	Voiceover
March 17, 2018	Nippon Impressionism "Water's Peak – Cloud Mountain"	NHK BS premium
July 31 – October 8, 2018; October 19 – December 16, 2018	Tsuguharu Fujita Exhibition ~ 50 Years After His Death	Audio guide – Tokyo Metropolitan Art Museum; National Museum of Modern Art, Kyoto
2018	24 Hours of Le Mans	Behind the scenes – J SPORTS
December 15, 2018	Shingo Kunieda・Yui Kamiji Match ~ Focus on 2020 ~	Wowow
March 30, 2020 – November 27, 2020	Asadora ~ Yell	NHK General TV (other integrations)
2021–2026	Jōhō 7days: Newscaster	
October 2022 – January 29, 2023	Felix Vallotton – Noir Et Blanc	Audio guide – Mitsubishi Ichigokan Museum

=== Radio ===
* indicates Internet radio.
Year(s)	Title	Details
2003–2011	The Prince of Tennis on the Radio	Nippon Cultural Broadcasting, irregular
2004–2005	Kenjiro & Mikako's Saturday Night Fever	Ōsaka Broadcasting Corporation
2004–2007	TSUDAKEN'S Aruiteikou (Let's Walk)	Seiyū Grand Prix (mobile)*
2005–2007	TSUDAKEN'S ROOM	V-STATION (mobile)*
2006–2007	Glass Fleet ~ Cleadio of the Gale	Name is a portmanteau of Glass Fleet's Cleo and "radio"; Internet radio station*
2007	Kenjiro Tsuda & Hidenobu Kiuchi's Chirarizumu Night	"Chirarizumu" is a humorous slang term akin to a quick flash of display or glimpsing (i.e., of skin, underwear); Ōsaka Radio
2008–2010	Hiru Dara (Sluggishly Midday)	/Dara/ likely from /daradara/ – onomatopoeically, sluggishly or idly; V-STATION (mobile)*
2010	Nakayoshi Group Oshaberikai Kai Radio (A Meeting Group of Close Friends Chatting Radio)	Nippon Cultural Broadcasting A&G Digital*
2011–2014	Tsuda Ken Roadshow Hateru Made Radio	Animate TV*
2011–2014	Hakuōki Meeting ~ Broadcast Recording	Animate TV* – weekly personality
2011	Nathan's Fire Room (from TIGER & BUNNY)	Within radio broadcasting*
2012	KR (from K)	Animate TV*, irregular personality
2012–2013	K of Radio【KR】(from K)	Animate TV*, special edition and last section were broadcast via Ustream (IBM Cloud Video)
2012–present	The New Prince of Tennis on the Radio	Nippon Cultural Broadcasting, irregular
2014	Radio Raidaasu! (from Long Riders)	HiBiKi Radio Station*
2014	K of Radio 3rd (from K)	Animate TV*
2014	Radio Raidaasu! A&G Branch-Off Edition ~ Ken Tsuda, Yukinko, & Yukka's Douga Dai Sakusen! ~	Chou A&G+*
2014–present	Oshaberi Yattema-su D (Let's Have a Chat! D)	K'z Station*
2015	K of Radio 4th (from K)	Animate TV*, irregular personality
2015–2016	Nippon Cultural Broadcasting Mobile-plus presents Ken Tsuda and Fukki's Hateru Made Radio wo Butaikasuru Namahousou	Chou A&G+*
2015–2016	Kenjiro Tsuda's Hateru Made Mobile	Nippon Cultural Broadcasting Mobile Members Site "Mobile plus"*
2015	Radio Raidaasu!! ~ Kenjiro Tsuda, Hiromi Igarashi, & Yurika Kurosawa's Douga Dai Sakusen! ~	Chou A&G+*, HiBiKi Radio Station*, Chou A&G+ (only including movie)
2015–2016	K of Radio 5th KR Go!! (from K)	Animate TV*
2016–present	Otomate Club ~ Radio Department ~	Internet radio station*
2016	Nanba Prison ~ Broadcast Station (from Nanbaka)	HiBiKi Radio Station*
2017	Kenjiro Tsuda & Genki Okawa's Joshi Kin Radio!	Animate Times*
2017–present	Futsū ni Tsuda Kenjirō (Normally Kenjiro Tsuda)	Internet radio station*
2018–present	Kenjiro Tsuda & Genki Okawa's Joshi Kin Radio!!	FRESH! HiBiKi Radio Station channel*
2018–present	Kenjiro Tsuda & Okamoto Nobuhiko's PsychopassMan	LOVE&ART Official Website
2019–present	COP CRAFT Special Public Relations Group	Internet radio station*
2019–present	The Ones Within Radio (During Broadcast) ~ Douka Shinu Ki de Kiite Kudasaimase ~	Internet radio station*
2019–present	TV Animation "African Salaryman" is Radio for Every Corporate Slave (odd number of occurrences)	In the original Japanese, /shachiku/ is a humorous term for "corporate slave" or "corporate drone; internet radio station*

=== Video products ===
Year(s)	Title
2006–2013	The Prince of Tennis series (The Prince of Tennis OVA Zenkoku Taikai Hen INVITATION DVD; The Prince of Tennis 100 Kyoku Marathon; TeniPuri Festa – 2009; 2011 in Budoukan; 2013; 2016 ~ Kassen ~
October 15, 2008	Kirakira ACTORS TV Vol. 2
2009–2012	Otomate Party♪
2011–2012	REBORN! series (Vongola Best Carnevale 4 BLUE; Vongola Ultimate Carnevale!!!!!; Vongola Best Carnevale Collection DVD ver. Millefiore)
February 24, 2012	Tsuda Ken Roadshow Hateru Made Radio ~ Zenkoku Hen ~ DVD
October 3, 2012	Kenjiro Tsuda PROJECT "925"
August 28, 2015	Tokyo Otome Restaurant Vol. 3
January 27, 2016	AD-LIVE 2015 Volume 1
July 26, 2017	Kenjiro Tsuda & Tetsuya Kakihara ~ Miwaku no No-pan Radio – Okinawa Gokujou Tabi BEACH DANDIES WITH Daisuke Namikawa
December 22, 2017	"ACCA: 13-Territory Inspection Dept." – Piece of Mind – read-aloud musical drama
April 25, 2018	AD-LIVE 2017 Volume 5
May 29, 2019	AD-LIVE 2018 Volume 8
2019	The Idolmaster Shiny Colors 1stLIVE FLY TO THE SHINY SKY – Tsutomu Amai (voice)

=== Publications ===
Date(s)	Title	Details
October 10, 2014	Kenjiro Tsuda 1st Photobook "FLOWING"	Publisher: Studio Warp; total number of pages: 160; all color
November 13–17, 2014; December 3–7, 2014	Photobook Publication Commemoration ~ "Kenjiro Tsuda Photobook"	Tōkyō; Kyōto
June 11, 2015	Kenjiro Tsuda Responsible Edit "EDGE" vol. 1	Publisher: Takarajimasha; includes special talk CD

=== Other ===
Year	Title	Role(s)	Details	Ref.
2017	Star Tours: The Adventures Continue	Kylo Ren		
2018	LINE Stamp "Yu-Gi-Oh! Duel Monsters ~ Sakebu! Kaiba"	Seto Kaiba		
2019	LINE Stamp "The Idolmaster Shiny Colors"	Tsutomu Amai		
2023	Jounetsu Tairiku	Himself	Vol. 1279	
2024	Warframe "Koumei & the Five Fates" Gameplay Trailer	Narrator	Japanese Version	

== Discography ==
=== Character songs ===
Release date	Product name	Singer(s)	Musical composition(s)	Notes (for reference)
July 28, 2004	DISTANCE	Sadaharu Inui (Kenjiro Tsuda)	"DISTANCE"	Television animation "The Prince of Tennis" related song
June 3, 2005	E=mc²	Sadaharu Inui (Kenjiro Tsuda)	"π (Pi)," "Running Boy," "Michi," "Te no Naka ni Sekai wo Tsutsumu Michi Futatsu Kousa Suru Uta," "Kaze no Yukue"	Television animation "The Prince of Tennis" related song
February 15, 2006	"Sugar Sugar Rune" Character CD: Rockin' Robin	Rockin' Robin (Kenjiro Tsuda)	"DON'T CRY"	Television animation "Sugar Sugar Rune" related song
March 18, 2009	Choutsugai	Kunimitsu Tezuka (Ryōtarō Okiayu), Sadaharu Inui (Kenjiro Tsuda), Yūshi Oshitari (Hidenobu Kiuchi)	"Sayonara・・・Megane's," "Kira★Kira Megane's," Manatsu no Megane's," "Megane Matsuri," "Odorimasen ka? Megane's," "Memory," "Go! Go! Megane's," "Manatsu no Mayonnaise"	Television animation "The Prince of Tennis" related songs; "Megane Matsuri" is Tsuda's solo on the track
October 3, 2012	PROJECT "925"	Captain Silver, Al, Cu, Shiina-kun, detective (all by Kenjiro Tsuda)	"Genshi Bangou no 47," "Algorithm," "Koi no Riterashi- Daccha," "Owari, Soshite Hajimari no Uta," "HELLO WORLD"	Each song sung by its respective character (e.g., "Genshi Bangou no 47" by Captain Silver)
June 1, 2016	Invisible Bandage	Sadaharu Inui (Kenjiro Tsuda)	"Invisible Bandage"	Television animation "The Prince of Tennis" related song
December 6, 2017	"Touken Ranbu: Hanamaru" Complete Song Collection	Hanamaru Tōken Danshi Ichidō (花丸刀剣男士一同) (Note: Yasusada Yamatonokami (Mitsuhiro Ichiki), Kiyomitsu Kashū (Toshiki Masuda), Hasebe Heshikiri (Tarusuke Shingaki), Imanotsurugi (Daiki Yamashita), Tōshirō Maeda (Reona Irie), Aoe Nikkari (Junji Majima), Kotetsu Hachisuka (Kazuyuki Okitsu), Yoshiyuki Mutsunokami (Kento Hama), Tōshirō Namazuo (Soma Saito), Kanesada Kasen (Kaito Ishikawa), Samonji Souza (Yūki Tai), Tōshirō Yagen (Seiichirō Yamashita), Mitsutada Shoukudaikiri (Takuya Satō), Gokotai (Yūta Kasuya), Kunihiro Yamanbagiri (Tomoaki Maeno), Shishiou (Ryōta Ōsaka), Ishikimaru (Hidenori Takahashi), Tōshirō Akita (Yoshitaka Yamaya), Tōshirō Midare (Kazutomi Yamamoto), Nakigitsune (Shintarō Asanuma), Kunitoshi Aizen (Seiichirō Yamashita), Masakuni Doudanuki (Tooru Sakurai), Kuninaga Tsurumaru (Soma Saito), Toshirō Hirano (Ryouta Asari), Toshirō Honebami (Yūto Suzuki), Tōshirō Atsushi (Daiki Yamashita), Samonji Sayo (Ayumu Murase), Uguisumaru (Tetsuya Kakihara), Kunihiro Horikawa (Jun'ya Enoki), Kanesada Izuminokami (Ryōhei Kimura), Taroutachi (Yūki Tai), Jirou-tachi (Eiji Miyashita), Ookurikara (Makoto Furukawa), Munechika Mikazuki (Kohsuke Toriumi), Tōshirō Hakata (Jun Oosuka), Kunihiro Yamabushi (Tooru Sakurai), Otegine (Kenji Hamada), Samonji Kousetsu (Takuya Satō), Kotetsu Urashima (Jun Fukushima), Hitofuri Ichigo (Atsushi Tamaru), Tonbokiri (Tooru Sakurai), Nihongou (Kenjiro Tsuda), Kogitsunemaru (Takashi Kondō), Iwatooshi (Eiji Miyashita), Hotarumaru (Yūichi Iguchi), Kuniyuki Akashi (Ryouta Asari), Kotetsu Nagasone (Tarusuke Shingaki))	"Hanamaru ◎ Biyori! 47-buri Ver."	Theater animation "Touken Ranbu: Hanamaru ~ Makuai Kaisouroku ~" theme song
February 28, 2018	"Touken Ranbu: Hanamaru" Sequel ~ Complete Song Collection – That Eight	Yasusada Yamatonokami (Mitsuhiro Ichiki), Kiyomitsu Kashū (Toshiki Masuda), Kotetsu Urashima (Jun Fukushima), Hitofuri Ichigo (Atsushi Tamaru), Tonbokiri (Tooru Sakurai), Nihongou (Kenjiro Tsuda), Kogitsunemaru (Takashi Kondō), Iwatooshi (Eiji Miyashita)	"Hanamaru no Hi no Moto de ver. 8"	Television animation "Zoku Touken Ranbu: Hanamaru" opening theme
November 6, 2019	White Collar Elegy	Toucan (Hiro Shimono) feat. Lizard (Kenjiro Tsuda)	"Get Your Wild! ~ African Night~"	Television animation "African Salaryman" related song
November 6, 2019	Rafu Rafu! – laugh life – 3rd Round	Corner Crave (Note: Claude-Michel Tori (KENN), Rintarō Tsunagi (Takashi Kondō), Tsubaki Arukawa (Yūto Uemura), Tatsumi Makura (Toshiyuki Toyonaga), Toranosuke Kabuse (Ryūji Yamamoto), Meisei Kamigata (Kenjiro Tsuda), Haku Mikire (Takuma Nagatsuka))	"Performers' Anthem"	"Rafu Rafu! – laugh life – " related song
