= Stefania Barr =

American actress (born 1994)

- Born: Stefania Noelle Barr; December 4, 1994 (age 31); Salt Lake City, Utah, United States
- Genres: Indie-Alternative rock, pop punk
- Occupations: Musician, actress, singer-songwriter
- Instruments: Vocals, guitar, ukulele
- Years active: 2001–present
- Label: Independent
- Website: http://www.shrinkthegiant.com

Stefania Noelle Barr (born December 4, 1994) is an American actress, singer, songwriter, composer, and lead vocalist of indie-alternative rock band Shrink the Giant. She is perhaps best known for her role as Maysilee Donner in the fan film, The Hunger Games: Second Quarter Quell.

== Performance career ==
Barr started her acting career in 2002 (age 7) with an appearance on The WB drama series Everwood. A year later, she appeared in the Disney Channel Original Movie Right on Track.

She was praised for her work ethic and maturity on set. Producer Jason Nacey of The Doorstep stated that she “stuck out like a sore thumb”, among other actors her age, after booking the lead role as a walk-in on the final round of auditions. Her roles in 2005's The Doorstep, 2006's Unrest and 2007's The Last Sin Eater and The Dance established her as a serious, mature-beyond-her-years actress.

She started her first indie-alternative rock band in early 2010 (age 14) (called Metanoia) with two high school friends. Barr sang lead vocals and played lead guitar, with Alyssa Kennington as backup vocals and rhythm guitar, and Thomas Flinders on drums. The trio played local venues together, including the Deer Valley Concert Series of Park City, Utah. After a few short months, they disbanded.

Under the direction of manager/producer Jean-Marc Barr, Barr joined with Aaron Hurt to form Shrink the Giant in the fall of 2010. They immediately began recording an album.

Barr's fame was established in 2011 by playing Maysilee Donner in The Hunger Games: Second Quarter Quell. Fans around the world immediately accepted and embraced her as the face of Maysilee, and a part of The Hunger Games "fandom."

Shrink the Giant released their first album worldwide on May 15, 2012. The album received great reviews from press and fans alike. SLUG Magazine heralded it as "polished and ready for the masses."

Barr was cast in a 2012 short film titled Life According to Penny.

As a composer, Stefania completed her first musical score in December, 2012 for the film Life According To Penny, in which she also starred as the lead character "Penny." Post-production on the short was completed January, 2012, and it is currently touring festivals across the country. After just one film festival screening, Stefania was nominated for the Best Original Score (which she won) and Best Lead Actress, in the Filmed in Utah Awards. The film itself won Best Short Film and the People's Choice Award, and will likely be made into a feature-length film within the next few years. She was also nominated for Best Original Score in the Filmbreak awards, in May 2012.

Through her online work with Mainstay (including another short film she was featured in for the book Unwind by Neal Shusterman), HarperCollins asked specifically for Stefania to act in a book trailer for Kat Zhang's recently released novel What's Left of Me. The trailer was featured exclusively on Entertainment Weekly upon its release, and is now available on HarperTeen's YouTube channel.

Since the release of their album, Shrink the Giant turned their attention to playing shows. Barr and bandmate Aaron recruited a local drummer (Alex Larsen), bassist (Marisa Wilde), and Stefania's brother (Sebastian Barr, a violinist and percussionist) to fill in the parts they recorded on the album. The full performance band began playing local venues together on August 1, 2012.

In September 2012, they submitted one of their songs to a Salt Lake City radio station, X96, in the "Put Your Band Where Our Bash Is" competition. They were chosen as finalists, and after competing against twelve other bands in an online competition, and then the top five groups in a "battle of the bands", they won.

On September 29, 2012, Stefania and the band played at the 17th-annual X96 Toyota "Big Ass Show" as one of nine bands, including Neon Trees, Imagine Dragons, Awolnation, Grouplove, The Used, The Wombats, Eve 6, and Dead Sara.

November 16, 2012, marked the release of the Summit Land Conservancy's 2nd Edition book, Summit County: Witness, which used a photograph taken by Barr as the cover image. The same photograph was also printed in Photographer's Forum "Best of High School and College Photography: 2012," earlier in the year, and accepted into the Springville Art Show, of Springville Utah, the previous year.

== Recent work ==
Shrink the Giant recently won the "Best Alternative" UTA Award for their first album.

Shrink the Giant's second album "Faceless" was released worldwide on December 4, 2014, in both digital download and CD format.

== Filmography ==
Film
Year	Film	Role	Notes
2019	Paranoid	Stacey Miller	Short Film
2019	Stalker	Stacey Miller	
2018	Trek: The Movie	Anna McDowell	
2017	Small Town Crime	Kristen "Kristy" Nevile	Strange Family / Nelms Brothers
2014	Guardian	Izzy	Hepburn Punk Productions
2013	The Iron Door	Paige	Adaptive Studios
2012	Lee	Aurelia	Sundance Institute/Chloe Zhao
2012	Siren's Song	Alana	48HFF
2011	Life According to Penny	Penny	Main character/Award Winning Short
2009	Joseph	Katharine Smith	
2009	The Last Eagle Scout	Young Kira	
2008	Once Upon a Summer	Andy (8 years old)	leading role
2008	Fifty Cents	Sam	Produced by Five One Films
2008	Illusions	Allie	
2007	The Dance	Ally	
2007	Getting Ahead	Mackenzie	
2007	The Last Sin Eater	Glynnis	
2006	Unrest	Allison Blanchard age 10	uncredited
2005	Doorstep	Hailey	award-winning short film
2005	Snowballs	Jennie	solo
2005	The First Vampire	Hannah	
2004	The Haunting	Sara	
Television
Year	Title	Role	Notes
2018	Youth & Consequences	Teen Girl	Episode: Crotch Riot
2006	Return to Halloweentown	Bratty Daughter	Disney Channel Original Movie
2003	Right on Track	Courtney Enders- Age 4	Disney Channel Original Movie
2002	Everwood	Susie Dudley (uncredited)	Directed by Kathy Bates

== See also ==
- Deer Valley
- Unrest (2006 film)
- Right on Track
- The Disney Channel
