= Neko ni Tensei Shita Oji-san =

Japanese manga series

- First tankōbon volume cover

ねこに転生したおじさん
- Manga
- Written by: Yajima
- Published by: Kadokawa Shoten
- Magazine: KadoComi
- Original run: October 2, 2023 – present
- Volumes: 8
- Anime television series
- Directed by: Rio; Takahiro Kawakoshi
- Music by: Itoken
- Studio: Studio Eight Colors
- Original network: FNS (Fuji TV)
- Original run: October 7, 2024 – September 8, 2025
- Episodes: 48

Neko ni Tensei Shita Oji-san (ねこに転生したおじさん; "The Guy That Got Reincarnated as a Cat") is a Japanese manga series written and illustrated by Yajima. Originally published as a web manga on Twitter and Instagram since February 2023, it was later picked up for serialization by Kadokawa Corporation, who then began serializing the series on their KadoComi website in October of the same year. The series has been compiled into eight tankōbon volumes by Kadokawa Shoten as of July 2026. An anime television series adaptation by Studio Eight Colors aired from October 2024 to September 2025.

== Plot ==
The series is centered around the daily lives of an old salaryman who was suddenly reincarnated into a cat, and his company's president who adopts the cat.

== Characters ==
Oji-san (おじさん)
Voiced by: Takahiro Kameoka
Pun-chan (プンちゃん)
Voiced by: Kana Hanazawa
President (社長, Shachō)
Voiced by: Tomokazu Seki
Mr. Itoyanagi (糸柳先生, Itoyanagi-sensei)
Voiced by: Kenjiro Tsuda
Tora (トラ)
Voiced by: Nobuhiko Okamoto
Tepu-chan (てぷちゃん)
Voiced by: Ayaka Ōhashi

== Media ==
=== Manga ===
No.	Japanese release date	Japanese ISBN
1	December 5, 2023	978-4-04-737717-2
2	May 1, 2024	978-4-04-737973-2
3	September 20, 2024	978-4-04-738127-8
4	March 19, 2025	978-4-04-738291-6
5	September 18, 2025	978-4-04-738595-5
6	February 13, 2026	978-4-04-738779-9
7	July 21, 2026	978-4-04-500149-9
8	July 21, 2026	978-4-04-500178-9

=== Anime ===
On March 11, 2024, during the Fuji TV Anime Lineup Press Conference 2024 event, an anime television series adaptation was announced. It is animated by Studio Eight Colors and directed by Rio and Takahiro Kawakoshi, and aired from October 7, 2024, to September 8, 2025, within the Poka Poka variety program on Fuji Television and its affiliates.

== Reception ==
In 2023, the manga was nominated for the ninth Next Manga Awards in the web category and was ranked second out of 61 nominees.
