= Jason Todd Ipson =

American film director

- Born: Jason Todd Ipson; July 28, 1972 (age 54); Salt Lake City, Utah
- Other names: Jason Todd Ipson, MD
- Education: University of Utah
- Occupations: film director, producer, screenwriter, fashion photographer, and surgeon
- Website: https://www.everybodywantstobeitalian.com

Jason Todd Ipson (born July 28, 1972) is an American director, screenwriter, producer, fashion photographer and licensed physician and surgeon. Transitioning from surgical residency to the USC School of Cinematic Arts in 1999, he went on to form Asgaard Entertainment as well as write/direct the theatrically released feature films Unrest and Everybody Wants to be Italian.

== Biography ==
Ipson was born in Salt Lake City, Utah, United States, the son of Robert K Ipson, an investment banker, entrepreneur, and Bonneville racetrack owner, and Linda Hayz, a model. He has a sister Jaime Ipson Burke, and had two half-brothers Cory K Ipson and Robert Scott Ipson by his father with Letha Rasmussen.

A Norse Mythology enthusiast, he named his two children Odin and Thor after Norse gods as well as his film production company Asgaard Entertainment.

Ipson dropped out of Highland High School at the age of 16 to attend the University of Utah on a Presidential Scholarship. He started as a business major, but then switched to biology and chemistry to become premed. After finishing medical school, he then completed a surgical internship at the University of Heidelberg in Germany before starting his surgical residency at the New England Medical Center in Boston. It is there that he met his future wife (also a licensed physician).

Ipson left his residency to attend USC’s Peter Stark Producing Program. He graduated having directed two thesis projects, Peeping Tom and The First Vampire, and produced the thesis project Playback. Peeping Tom took grand prize at 16 short film festivals. The First Vampire was not shown on festival circuits in hopes of releasing it as a DVD bonus feature someday. The short version won a production grant in 2001 for its use of science from the Alfred P. Sloan Foundation.

Ipson shoots fashion photography for magazine publications. He is also a licensed physician in the state of California and lives in Beverly Hills.

== Filmography ==
Director

Year	Film
2002	Peeping Tom (short)
2004	The First Vampire (short)
2006	Unrest
2008	Everybody Wants to be Italian
TBA	One Night Standard
TBA	Suicide Bomber
TBA	Nosophoros

Writer

Year	Film
2006	Unrest
2008	Everybody Wants to be Italian
TBA	One Night Standard
TBA	Nosophoros
TBA	Ann Pia
