= Everybody Wants to Be Italian =

- Original poster
- Directed by: Jason Todd Ipson
- Written by: Jason Todd Ipson
- Produced by: Jaime Burke; James Huntsman
- Starring: Cerina Vincent; Jay Jablonski; John Kapelos; John Enos III; Marisa Petroro
- Cinematography: Michael Fimognari
- Edited by: Mike Saenz
- Music by: Michael Cohen
- Distributed by: Roadside Attractions
- Release dates: September 18, 2007 (Boston Film Festival); September 5, 2008 (United States)
- Running time: 105 minutes
- Country: United States
- Language: English
- Budget: $3 million
- Box office: $532,726

Everybody Wants to Be Italian is a 2007 American romantic comedy film written and directed by Jason Todd Ipson. The screenplay focuses on the relationship between a blue collar worker and a veterinarian.

The film premiered at the Boston Film Festival on September 18, 2007 and released theatrically in the United States on September 5, 2008.

== Plot ==
Jake Bianski is the owner of a fish market in the North End of Boston, Massachusetts. For the past eight years he actively has pursued his former girlfriend Isabella, despite the fact she is married and has three children.

Anxious to put an end to their boss' obsession with his one-time love, Steve Bottino and Gianluca Tempesti arrange for him to meet veterinarian Marisa Costa at a dance for singles at the local Italian club. On their first date, a deluded Jake confesses he is involved with another woman and suggests he and Marisa become friends rather than lovers.

After years of rejecting Jake's advances, Isabella finally leaves her husband, and she and her children move into Jake's small apartment above his fish store. Before long, her husband has convinced her to return home, and Jake finally admits he and Isabella have no future together. He follows Marisa to Italy, where he discovers she is involved with another man, but once again Jake refuses to accept reality and, determined to win her back, he begins to woo Marisa.

== Cast ==
- Jay Jablonski as Jake Bianski
- Cerina Vincent as Marisa Costa
- John Kapelos as Steve Bottino
- John Enos III as Gianluca Tempesti
- Zak Lee Guarnaccia as Luigi the Waiter
- Marisa Petroro as Isabella
- Richard Libertini as Papa Aldo Tempesti
- Tammy Pescatelli as Katerina
- Dan Cortese as Michael
- Penny Marshall as Teresa
- Sylvia PanacioneasAnna

== Critical reception ==
Jeannette Catsoulis of The New York Times called the film "atrocious" and "painfully humorless" with "annoying characters navigating unbelievable situations."

Matt Prigge of Philadelphia Weekly rated the film C+, calling it "a pleasant but entirely forgettable bit of fluff" and "merely standard genre fare with a couple decent ideas and a refreshing lack of sentimentality." He added, "At 105 minutes, Italian is far too slack, but it radiates a certain low-watt charm - the jokes aren't particularly notable, but at least they keep coming. The movie is basically one long half-grin: It's consistently almost-funny, well-acted and it generally doesn't make you want to pound stakes into your eyes."

Justin Chang of Variety called the film "clumsy but inoffensive" and added, "To his credit, writer-director Jason Todd Ipson mostly avoids the shrill stereotyping of My Big Fat Greek Wedding . . . Relentless accordion music adds grating ambience, and the inevitable Italy-set coda looks none too authentic. Dead fish in Jake's market are by far the pic's freshest elements."

Steven Rea of The Philadelphia Inquirer observed, "Full of clunky humor, battle-of-the-sexes musings and spicy accordion music, Everybody Wants to Be Italian is relentless - but not necessarily relentless fun."

== Home media ==
Lions Gate Entertainment released the film in anamorphic widescreen format on DVD on February 3, 2009. Bonus features include commentary with screenwriter/director Jason Todd Ipson and editor Mike Saenz, deleted scenes, and cast interviews and screen tests.
