= Adam Lebovitz =

American film producer

- Born: Highland Park, Illinois
- Occupation: producer
- Years active: 2003 - present

Adam Lebovitz is an American film and television producer, focusing on thriller, horror and comedy. He is best known for his horror movies Tortured and Unrest as well as his contributions to the production industry by creating the film budgeting website www.quickfilmbudget.com.

== Education and early career ==
Lebovitz was born in Highland Park, Illinois as the middle child of three children. After he graduated from the University of Pennsylvania, Wharton School, he moved to Los Angeles.

In 2003, Adam began working with his brother Nolan and they created Five Star Media. Lebovitz's first executive producer credit was for the independent comedy film "Doctor Benny" which opened theatrically in Los Angeles and Chicago. His first producer credit came on the horror film Unrest which Lions Gate and After Dark Films released theatrically. This led to producing "Tortured" which was directed by Nolan Lebovitz and starred Laurence Fishburne, Cole Hauser, and James Cromwell. Sony Pictures Entertainment released "Tortured" in the Fall of 2008.

In 2008, Adam and Nolan expanded into television and new media by creating a web series called "FreshmanJulie" which launched on YouTube. In 2009, Adam and Nolan sold the digital series "Bloody Knuckles" to Fox Television Studios.

== Filmography (producer) ==
=== Films ===
Released:

- Tortured (2008)
- Unrest (2007) (with Lions Gate)
- Doctor Benny (2003)
