= Unrest (2006 film) =

- Directed by: Jason Todd Ipson
- Written by: Chris Billett; Jason Todd Ipson
- Produced by: Adam Lebovitz; Julio Bove; Jason Todd Ipson
- Starring: Corri English; Scot Davis; Joshua Alba; Jay Jablonski; Marisa Petroro; Derrick O'Connor
- Cinematography: Michael Fimognari
- Edited by: Mike Saenz
- Music by: Michael Cohen
- Production company: Asgaard Entertainment
- Distributed by: After Dark Films; Freestyle Releasing
- Release dates: September 7, 2006 (SoCal Independent Film Festival); November 17, 2006 (United States)
- Running time: 88 minutes
- Country: United States
- Language: English
- Box office: $2.7 million

Unrest is an independent horror film directed by Jason Todd Ipson and starring Corri English, Scot Davis, Joshua Alba, Jay Jablonski, Marisa Petroro and Derrick O'Connor. It was shown at the horror film festival 8 Films To Die For during the 2006 fall season.

At the 2006 International Horror and Sci-Fi Film Festival it was awarded Best Picture for Horror, and the lead actress, English, won Best Actress.

== Plot ==
The film revolves around a cadaver that seems to bring misfortune to those who come into contact with it.

Although there is very little corporeal manifestation of the ghosts, people seem to die when they enrage the spirit which is linked with a special cadaver, by disrespecting it or otherwise. The story takes place mostly in a hospital, where a young medical student, Alison Blanchard, learns anatomy. By observing the cadaver she was assigned, she discovers that the body had self-inflicted wounds and also had a child. She soon discovers that there is something wrong with the cadaver, which they have nicknamed "Norma." Mysterious deaths occur in the hospital, which include the fiancée of one of Allison's team members and several hospital employees.

It is revealed that the cadaver is that of Alita Covas, who once led an archaeological expedition to an Aztec sacrificial site. There she uncovered 50,000 bodies which were offered to Tlazōlteōtl, the Aztec god of sex, sexuality, lust, carnality, sin, vice, impurity, temptation, fertility, purification, absolution, steam baths, and a patroness of adulterers. Afterward, she herself became a prostitute and started showing symptoms of mental imbalance. Later in her life, she committed murders and was subsequently put in a mental asylum, where she died—presumably by her own hand.

Once Alison learns the true nature of the cadaver, she decides the corpse must be returned to Brazil to satisfy the Aztec god. After a series of gruesome events, Alison and her classmate/love interest take Alita's now dismembered corpse and cremate her in the hospital. In the end, Alison heads to Brazil to spread the ashes in an attempt to put the spirit to rest; however, the final scene suggests that the spirit remains in the hospital.

== Cast ==
Cast listing

- Corri English as Alison Blanchard
  - Stefania Barr – Alison Blanchard (10 year old) (uncredited)
- Marisa Petroro as Alita Covas
- Ben Livingston as Ivan Verbukh
- Abner Genece as Malcolm Little
- Derrick O'Connor as Dr. Walter Blackwell
- Scot Davis as Brian Cross
- Joshua Alba as Carlos Aclar
- Jay Jablonski as Rick O'Connor
- Reb Fleming as Dr. Carolyn Saltz
- Anna Johnson as Jennifer
- J.C. Cunningham as Medical Records
- Terence Goodman as Officer
- Rhett Willman as Security

Uncredited appearances in the film include the film's producer Julio Bove as a psychiatrist, as well as Mario DeAngelis as an EMT-Specialist, Susan Duerden as Jasmin Blanchard, Christopher J. Ghhghhh as a medical student and Jerry Tracy as a highway patrolman.

== Production ==
The film was shot in a real morgue over the span of 24 days. The film features footage of genuine autopsies and cadavers.

== Release ==
Unrest saw its premiere at the SoCal Independent Film Festival on September 7, 2006. The film also played at Fantastic Fest. The film was released theatrically on November 17, 2006, by After Dark Films and Freestyle Releasing.

=== Home media ===
The film was released on DVD by Lionsgate Home Entertainment on March 27, 2007.

== Reception ==
Johnny Butane of Dread Central wrote "you've probably not seen anything quite like Unrest before". Michael Gingold for Fangoria positively compared the film to The Gravedancers and called the film "a thoughtful and spooky little movie that stands apart from the formulas that bind so many horror films".
