= African Office Worker =

Japanese manga series

- Cover of African Office Worker volume 1 by Media Factory

アフリカのサラリーマン (Africa no Sararīman)
- Genre: Comedy; Slice of life
- Manga
- Written by: Gamu
- Published by: Media Factory
- Imprint: MFC Gene Pixiv Series
- Magazine: pixiv Comic
- Original run: December 2014 – present
- Volumes: 4
- Original net animation
- Studio: Production I.G
- Released: June 5, 2017 – June 30, 2017
- Runtime: 3 minutes
- Episodes: 10
- Anime television series
- Directed by: Tetsuya Tatamitani
- Written by: Yūichirō Momose
- Music by: Tako Yamaguchi
- Studio: Hotzipang
- Licensed by: NA: Funimation
- Original network: Tokyo MX, BS11, KBS, SUN, TVA
- Original run: October 6, 2019 – December 22, 2019
- Episodes: 12
- icon

African Office Worker (アフリカのサラリーマン, Africa no Sararīman), otherwise known as Africa Salaryman, is a Japanese comedy manga series by Gamu, serialized online via pixiv Comic website since December 2014. It has been collected in four tankōbon volumes by Media Factory. An original net animation adaptation streamed on Production I.G's Tate Anime (now Anime Beans) app between June 5 and June 30, 2017, and an anime television series adaptation by Hotzipang aired from October 6 to December 22, 2019.

== Plot ==
The story follows three anthropomorphic animals, a lion, a toucan, and a lizard. They work together as ordinary office employees in a modern Japan corporate environment. Their workdays are filled with absurd situations, workplace conflicts, and social gatherings, often exaggerated by their animal traits and personalities. The Lion is kind and serious about his job, the Lizard is cynical and often exasperated by his coworkers, and the Toucan, whose selfish behavior and constant antics frequently cause trouble in the office.

== Characters ==
- Lion (ライオン, Raion)

Voiced by: Kento Fujinuma (ONA), Akio Ōtsuka (TV anime), Cris George (English)

- Lizard (トカゲ, Tokage)

Voiced by: Kengo Tsujii (ONA), Kenjiro Tsuda (TV anime), Ian Sinclair (English)

- Toucan (オオハシ, Ōhashi)

Voiced by: Setsuo Ito (ONA), Hiro Shimono (TV anime), Larry Brantley (English)

- Company President Turtle (カメ社長, Kame-shachō)

Voiced by: Akira Ishida (TV anime), Ben Phillips (English)

- Shishimura (シシ村)

Voiced by: Eri Kitamura (TV anime), Amber Lee Connors (English)

- Gorimi (ゴリ美, Gorimi)

Voiced by: Yui Ogura (TV anime), Monica Rial (English)

- Lethal Hamster (殺傷ハムスター, Sasshō Hamusutā)

Voiced by: Hina Kino (TV anime), Jad Saxton (English)

- Caracal (カラカル, Karakaru)

Voiced by: Hiroshi Kamiya (TV anime), J. Michael Tatum (English)

- Honey Badger (ラーテル, Rāteru)

Voiced by: Tatsuhisa Suzuki (TV anime), Jeremy Inman (English)

- Honeyguide (ミツオシエ, Mitsuoshie)

Voiced by: Kengo Kawanishi (TV anime), Anthony Bowling (English)

- Crane (ツル, Tsuru)

Voiced by: Sōma Saitō (TV anime), Stephen Fu (English)

== Media ==
=== Manga ===
The comedy manga follows a lion, toucan, and lizard as they live the lives of office workers in a capitalist society in Japan, while also dealing with their unique situations as animals living beyond the savanna and the food chain.

=== Anime ===
An anime original net animation adaptation streamed on Production I.G's Tate Anime (now Anime Beans) app between June 5 and June 30, 2017.

An anime television series adaptation aired from October 6 to December 22, 2019, on Tokyo MX, BS11, KBS, SUN, TVA. The series is animated by Hotzipang and directed by Tetsuya Tatamitani, with Yūichirō Momose handling series composition, and Tako Yamaguchi composing the music. Hiro Shimono performed the series' opening theme song "Soul Flag", while Akio Ōtsuka performed the series' ending theme song "White-Collar Elegy.". Funimation has licensed the series for a simuldub.

== Reception ==
The anime series' first episode garnered mixed reviews from Anime News Network's staff during the Fall 2019 season previews. Theron Martin felt that Hotzipang's animation style won't catch on outside the series but commended it for giving visual aid to the "pretty funny" humor, saying the show will be remembered as the "weaker cousin" to Beastars. James Beckett was critical of the CG animation being of lesser quality compared to Pop Team Epic and felt repelled by Toucan's groan-inducing antics, but gave praise to the "inconsistent but mostly entertaining" comedy and the animation techniques used throughout the episode, saying it won't be his go-to comedy of the season but will occasionally check it out based on the animators' creativity. Rebecca Silverman criticized the thin premise for failing to grab her attention beyond its concept, the "clunky" animation and Toucan's obnoxious personality, concluding that: "It's easy to see how this is trying its best, but for me, that just wasn't enough to make me want to see more." Nick Creamer felt the center piece gags were "tired or off-puttingly mean-spirited" and the CG models came across as "consistently clumsy in motion", but praised the episode for conducting "smaller comic beats" in the background and dialogue, and emitting "great little visual embellishments" throughout its runtime, concluding that: "On the whole, too many of Africa Salaryman's jokes fell flat for me personally to recommend it, but it's certainly an interesting work, possessing both a solid understanding of comic structure, and a welcome eye for visual experimentation." Fellow ANN editor Amy McNulty chose Africa Salaryman as her pick for the Worst Anime of Fall 2019, criticizing the tryhard attempts at different animation styles, unlikable one-note characters and the various jokes causing "comedic whiplash" throughout the series, concluding with: "I did chuckle on occasion while watching this show, but not often enough."
