= Tortured (film) =

- DVD cover
- Directed by: Nolan Lebovitz
- Written by: Nolan Lebovitz
- Produced by: Mary L. Aloe; Adam Lebovitz; Kirk Shaw
- Starring: Cole Hauser; Laurence Fishburne; James Cromwell
- Cinematography: Steven Bernstein
- Edited by: Robert K. Lambert
- Music by: Nathan Barr
- Production company: Five Star Pictures
- Distributed by: Sony Pictures Home Entertainment
- Release date: September 16, 2008 (U.S. DVD)
- Running time: 107 minutes
- Countries: United States; Canada
- Language: English

Tortured is a 2008 American crime thriller film written and directed by Nolan Lebovitz and starring Cole Hauser, Laurence Fishburne, and James Cromwell. It was released direct-to-DVD in the U.S. on September 16, 2008. It was filmed in Vancouver, Canada.

== Plot ==
FBI agent Kevin Cole goes undercover as Jimmy Vaughn, an organized crime enforcer. When he is ordered to undertake the week-long torture of accountant Archie Green, Kevin begins to question his role in government service, where often he must hurt or end another human being's life just to make a bust.

== Cast ==
- Cole Hauser as Agent Kevin Cole/Jimmy Vaughn
- Laurence Fishburne as Archie Green
- James Cromwell as Jack Cole
- Emmanuelle Chriqui as Becky
- Jon Cryer as Agent Brian Mark
- Kevin Pollak as FBI Psychiatrist
- James Denton as Murphy
- Paul Perri as Emmet Gnoww
- Robert LaSardo as Mo
- Patrick Sabongui as Coffee Shop Manager
- Ziggy as Voice of Ziggy

== Reception ==
Tortured received mixed to negative reviews from critics. Andrew L. Urban praised the actor's performances and the film's production value however drew attention to poor writing saying that "the writing tries so hard to make a mysterious web of deceit that it ends up tying itself in knots". David Nusair gave the film a score of 1.5 out of 4 calling it a "well-intentioned yet undeniable misfire".
