= Adam Benisz =

Polish army officer (1888–1991)

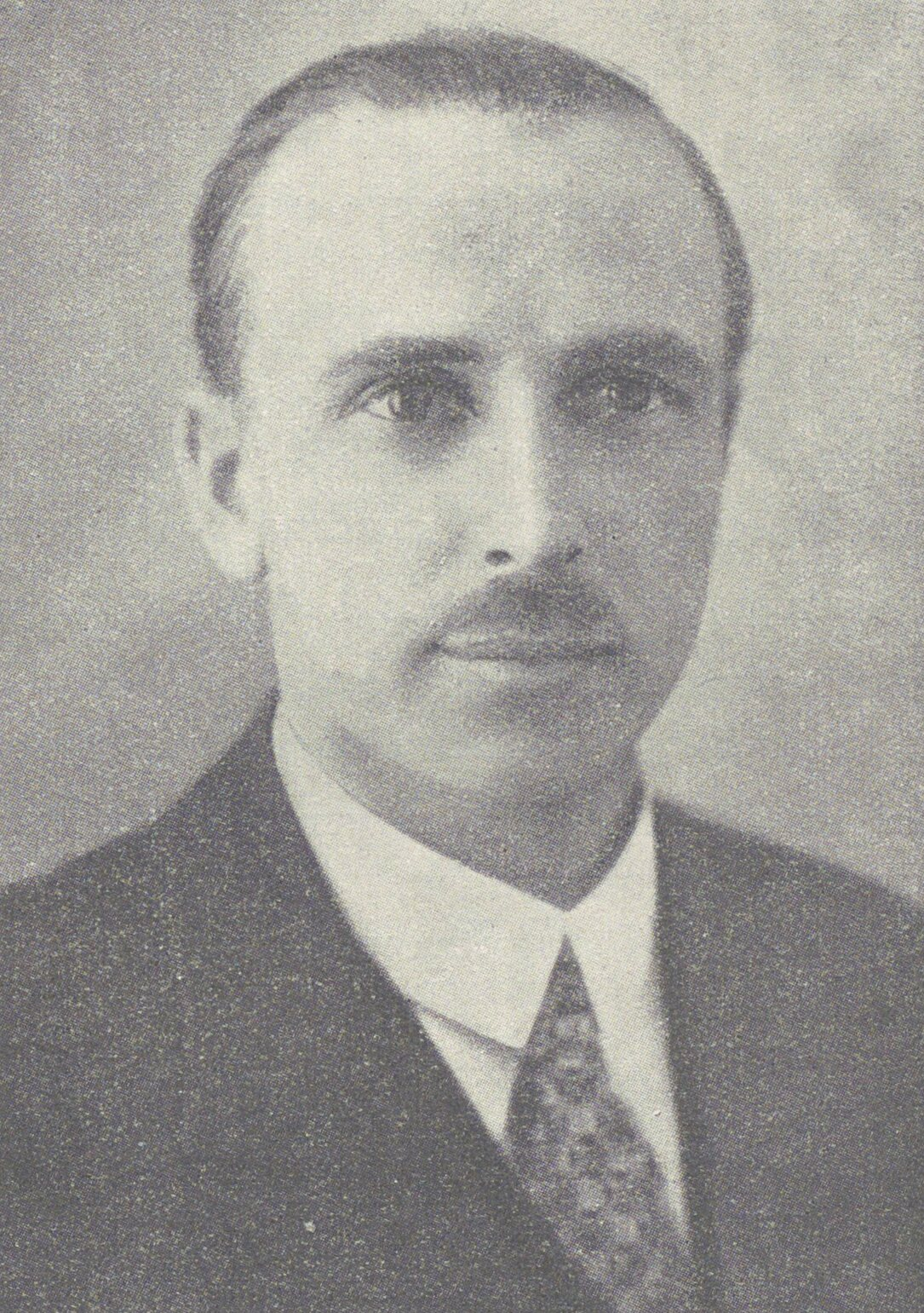
- Born: 10 November 1888; Nowy Sącz, Poland
- Died: 24 January 1991 (aged 102); Nowy Sącz, Poland
- Education: Jagiellonian University
- Military career
- Allegiance: Polish Armed Forces
- Unit: Regiment Katowice
- Commands: Kedzierzyn
- Awards: Order of Polonia Restituta

Adam Karol Benisz (10 November 1888 – 24 January 1991) was an officer for the Polish army and an insurgent Silesian. He studied law at the Jagiellonian University in Kraków.

In 1921, during the Third Silesian Uprising, he was a tactical officer in the Regiment Katowice. He later became commander of the garrison in Kedzierzyn, and was put in charge of the defense of the city during the fighting with the Germans. In 1941, he became a soldier of the Polish Armed Forces.

He died on 24 January 1991, in Nowy Sącz.

== Books ==
He was the author of these books about the Silesian Uprisings:

- Upper Silesia in the struggle for Polish (1930)
- Fight for Kedzierzyn and Mount St Anny (1961)
- In the Storm of Life (1976)

== Awards ==
- Order of Polonia Restituta

== See also ==
- Józef Piłsudski

== Sources ==
- "Encyklopedia PWN" (in Polish). Encyklopedia PWN.
- "Saczopedia" (in Polish). saczopedia. Archived from the original on 2015-11-16.
