= Adam Biro =

Hungarian-French publishing house founder

Adam Biro is founder of the art book publishing house Biro Éditeur in Paris and the author of nine books. Biro served as manager of Biro Éditeur until 2009, when the position passed to Stéphane Cohen. As of 2010, Biro continued to serve as an editorial advisor. Biro was born in Hungary, but left for Paris at the age of fifteen.

== List of works ==
- Is It Good for the Jews?: More Stories from the Old Country and the New by Adam Biro, Translated by Catherine Tihanyi (Chicago, IL: University of Chicago Press, 2009, ISBN 978-0-226-05217-5)
- One Must Also Be Hungarian by Adam Biro, Translated by Catherine Tihanyi (Chicago, IL: University of Chicago Press, 2006, ISBN 978-0-226-05212-0)
- Two Jews on a Train: Stories from the Old Country and the New by Adam Biro, Translated by Catherine Tihanyi (Chicago, IL: University of Chicago Press, 2001, ISBN 978-0-226-05214-4)

== Book reviews ==
- Review, One Must Also Be Hungarian
- Review, One Must Also Be Hungarian
