= University of Utah College of Engineering =

John and Marcia Price College of Engineering in Utah, U.S.

Coordinates: 40°46′04″N 111°50′46″W

John and Marcia Price College of Engineering at the University of Utah
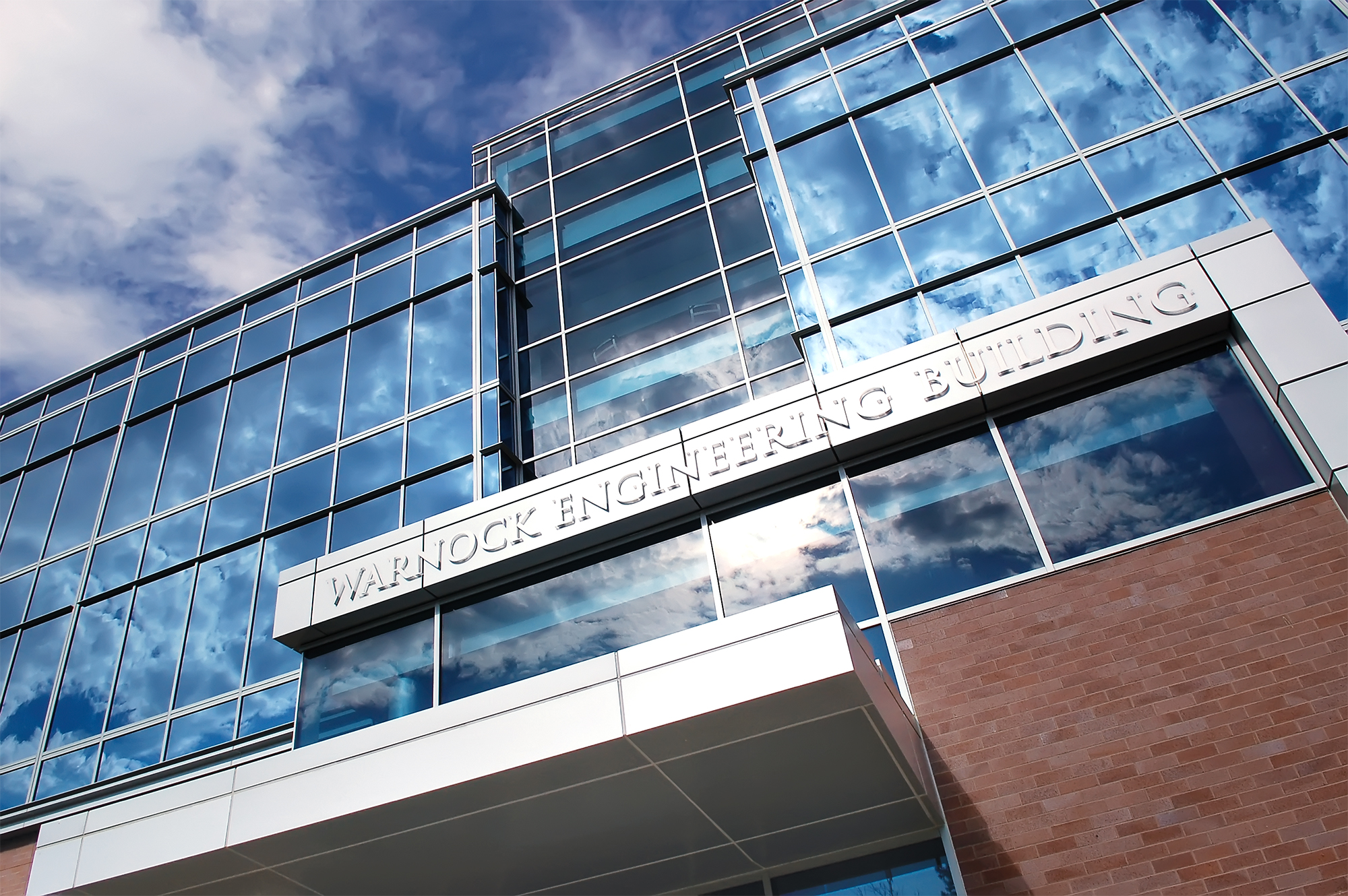
- John and Marva Warnock Engineering Building
- Type: Public
- Established: 1896
- Dean: Richard B. Brown
- Faculty: 156
- Undergraduates: 3,368
- Postgraduates: 1,073
- Location: Salt Lake City, Utah, USA
- Website: www.price.utah.edu

The John and Marcia Price College of Engineering at the University of Utah is an academic college of the University of Utah in Salt Lake City, Utah. The college offers undergraduate and graduate degrees in engineering and computer science.

== History ==
The College of Engineering at the University of Utah originated from the State School of Mines, established in the 1890s. Dedicated to enhancing Utah's mining industry, it was among the first engineering programs west of the Mississippi River.

The first modern four-year engineering degree at the school was introduced in 1895. Joseph F. Merrill was the first principal and the Merrill Engineering Building was named in his honor. Richard Lyman was recruited from Brigham Young Academy to teach the technical engineering curriculum. Lyman organized the first Department of Engineering in 1896.

During the past 118 years, the College has awarded nearly 24,000 engineering degrees. Many alumni have achieved international recognition in industry, manufacturing, research, education, law, medicine and many other professions.

Some of the companies founded by graduates and faculty of the College of Engineering include: TRW, Evans and Sutherland, Silicon Graphics, Netscape, WordPerfect, Sarcos, Opto 22, Novell, Atari, Adobe, and Pixar, to name a few. Many other graduates hold executive leadership positions in companies and educational institutions worldwide; several also actively serve their communities in civic and governmental leadership roles.

Today, approximately 3,400 undergraduate and nearly 1,100 graduate students are enrolled in the College. The College has 156 tenure and tenure-track faculty members and $81.5 million in engineering research expenditures, which places it 30th among 206 engineering colleges for research productivity.

== Accreditation ==
The University of Utah is accredited by the Northwest Commission on Colleges and Universities.

The College of Engineering is a member of the American Society for Engineering Education.

The Accreditation Board for Engineering and Technology has accredited the following undergraduate programs in the College of Engineering: bioengineering, chemical engineering, civil engineering, computer engineering, electrical engineering, materials science and engineering, and mechanical engineering.

== Rankings ==
The U.S. News & World Report ranks the College of Engineering at the University of Utah:

- #34 Biomedical Engineering (out of 107 graduate programs)
- #48 Electrical/Electronic/Communications Engineering (out of 177 graduate programs)
- #49 Computer Engineering (among 143 graduate programs)
- #51 Materials Engineering (among 95 graduate programs)
- #53 Best Engineering Schools (among 193 graduate programs)
- #53 Civil Engineering (among 145 graduate programs)
- #57 Chemical Engineering (among 126 graduate programs)
- #61 Mechanical Engineering (among 170 graduate programs)
- #74 Environmental/Environmental Health Engineering (among 100 graduate programs)

The American Society of Engineering Education (ASEE) ranks the College of Engineering at the University of Utah:

- #26 Computer science [inside engineering] degrees (among 171 schools)
- #34 Engineering doctoral degrees awarded (among 196 schools)
- #35 Tenured/tenure-track faculty (among 357 schools)
- #35 Highest ratio of research expenditures to doctoral degree recipients (among 126 schools)
- #39 Mechanical engineering degrees (among 288 schools)
- #39 Undergraduate enrollment (among 348 schools)
- #47 Graduate school enrolment (among 271 schools)

== Departments ==
The College of Engineering is made up of seven departments: bioengineering, chemical engineering, civil and environmental engineering, electrical and computer engineering, materials science and engineering, mechanical engineering, and the School of Computing.

The College is also home to four specialty engineering programs including computer engineering, entertainment arts and engineering, nuclear engineering and petroleum engineering, as well as 28 multidisciplinary research institutes and centers.

In 2014, the College began offering data center engineering and big data certificate programs. The data center engineering certificate program prepares undergraduates for work in data center operations and management by combining mechanical engineering, electrical engineering and computer science coursework. The big data certificate program draws on computer science coursework to provide graduate students and professional computer scientists the skills to process, analyze and manage large, complex data.

=== Biomedical Engineering ===
The Biomedical Engineering Department at the University of Utah offers undergraduate degrees in Biomedical Engineering and graduate degrees in Biomedical Engineering. The Department has major research funding that supports initiatives in:

- BioDesign
- Biomedical Imaging
- Biomechanics
- Cardiovascular Engineering
- Molecular, Cell, and Tissue Therapeutics
- Neural Engineering

Many Biomedical Engineering faculty members are adjunct faculty at University of Utah School of Medicine, leading to several successful interdisciplinary research projects between the School of Medicine and the College of Engineering.

=== Chemical Engineering ===
The Department of Chemical Engineering at the University of Utah offers undergraduate and graduate degrees in Chemical Engineering. This Department was recently ranked 5th nationally in federal research and development funding. It has major research funding that supports initiatives in:

- Biological and biomedical engineering
- Energy and fuels
- Environmental engineering
- Multi-scale simulation
- Nano materials and technology
- Reaction engineering
- Rheology
- Systems and control

The Department of Chemical Engineering administers the petroleum engineering Master of Science degree. Launched in 2013.

=== Civil and Environmental Engineering ===
Civil and environmental engineering careers are geared towards students with both vision and analytic skills. As engineers develop in their careers, they will be challenged to imagine new ways to support the needs of business, industry, public agencies and nations.

At the University of Utah, the Department of Civil and Environmental Engineering (CvEEN) engineers are trained in professional communication, project management and their technical discipline with opportunities to seek advanced degrees in engineering, law, business or medicine. The department and local industry offer paid internships, scholarships and employment opportunities to help defray the cost of tuition and living expenses. CvEEN offers undergraduate and graduate degrees and has major research funding that supports initiatives in:

- Environmental Engineering
- Geotechnical and Construction Materials
- Structural Engineering
- Transportation
- Water Resources

The Civil and Environmental Engineering Department is also home to the growing Utah Nuclear Engineering Program (UNEP). Master's and doctoral degrees are offered to those holding a B.S. degree in engineering or a science-related field. Undergraduates can take selected courses as technical electives and in preparation for nuclear engineering graduate degree programs.

=== Electrical and Computer Engineering ===
The Electrical and Computer Engineering Department at the University of Utah offers undergraduate degrees in Electrical Engineering and Computer Engineering as well as graduate degrees in Electrical and Computer Engineering. The Department has major research funding that supports initiatives in:

- Communications and signal processing
- Control systems
- Implantable medical devices
- Micro-Electro-Mechanical Systems (MEMS)
- Micro- and nano- devices and fabrication
- Microwaves and electromagnetics
- Optics and optoelectronics
- Power engineering
- Semiconductors
- VLSI system design

The Department of Electrical and Computer Engineering and the School of Computing jointly administer the computer engineering specialty program.

=== Materials Science and Engineering ===
The Department of Materials Science and Engineering at the University of Utah offers undergraduate and graduate degrees in materials science and engineering. The department has major research funding that supports initiatives in:

- Biomaterials
- Ceramics
- Composites
- Nanomaterials
- Semiconductors and electronic materials

=== Mechanical Engineering ===
The Department of Mechanical Engineering at the University of Utah offers undergraduate and graduate degrees in mechanical engineering. The department has major research funding that supports initiatives in:

- Bio-mechanical engineering
- Composites
- Control systems
- Design
- Energy systems
- Ergonomics and safety
- Fluid Mechanics
- Heat Transfer
- Manufacturing
- Micro- and nano- systems
- Thermodynamics
- Robotics
- Solid mechanics

=== School of Computing ===
The School of Computing at the University of Utah offers undergraduate and graduate degrees in computer science. The department has major research funding that supports initiatives in:

- Applied computation
- Artificial intelligence
- Computer graphics
- Computer systems
- Program analysis
- Data management, analysis, and visualization

The School of Computing is also home to the Entertainment Arts and Entertainment (EAE) Program, which is the result of interdisciplinary collaboration between the College of Engineering and the University of Utah College of Fine Arts. In 2014, the EAE Program was ranked second for its undergraduate program and fourth for its graduate program by the Princeton Review.

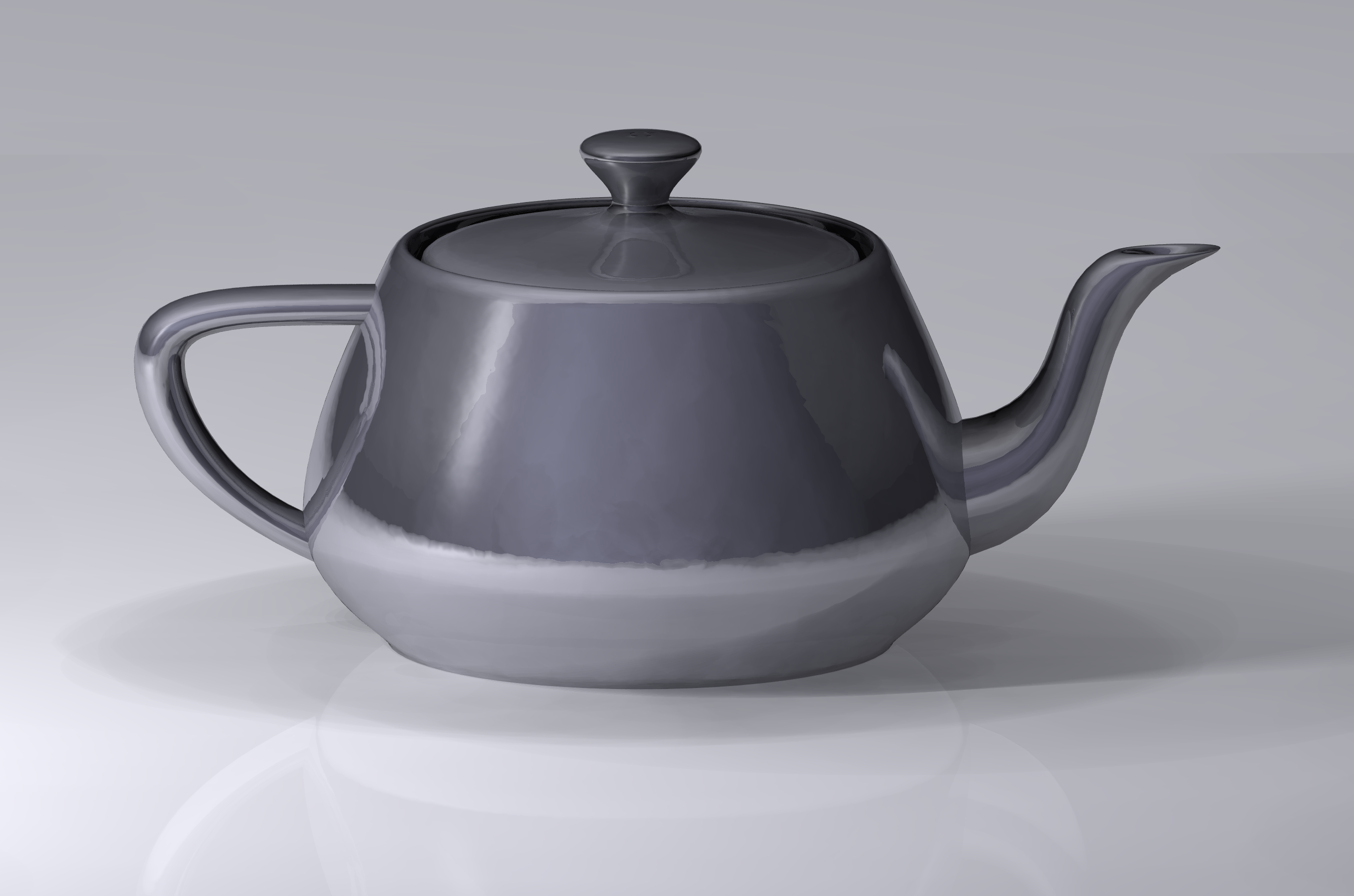
The Utah teapot, a model by Martin Newell (1975).

The University of Utah was one of the original four nodes of ARPANET, the world's first packet-switched network and embryo of the current worldwide Internet. In late 1969, the U's computer graphics department was linked into the node at Stanford Research Institute in Menlo Park, California to complete the initial four-node network.

The School of Computing has made important contributions to computer graphics and computer animation. These contributions include: Gouraud shading, the Phong reflection model, the Phong shading method, and the rendering equation.

The School of Computing is also affiliated with the Scientific Computing and Imaging Institute, which focuses on research in visualization, scientific computing, and medical image analysis. The institute currently has over 200 faculty and staff, most of which are from the School of Computing or Bioengineering departments.

== Buildings ==
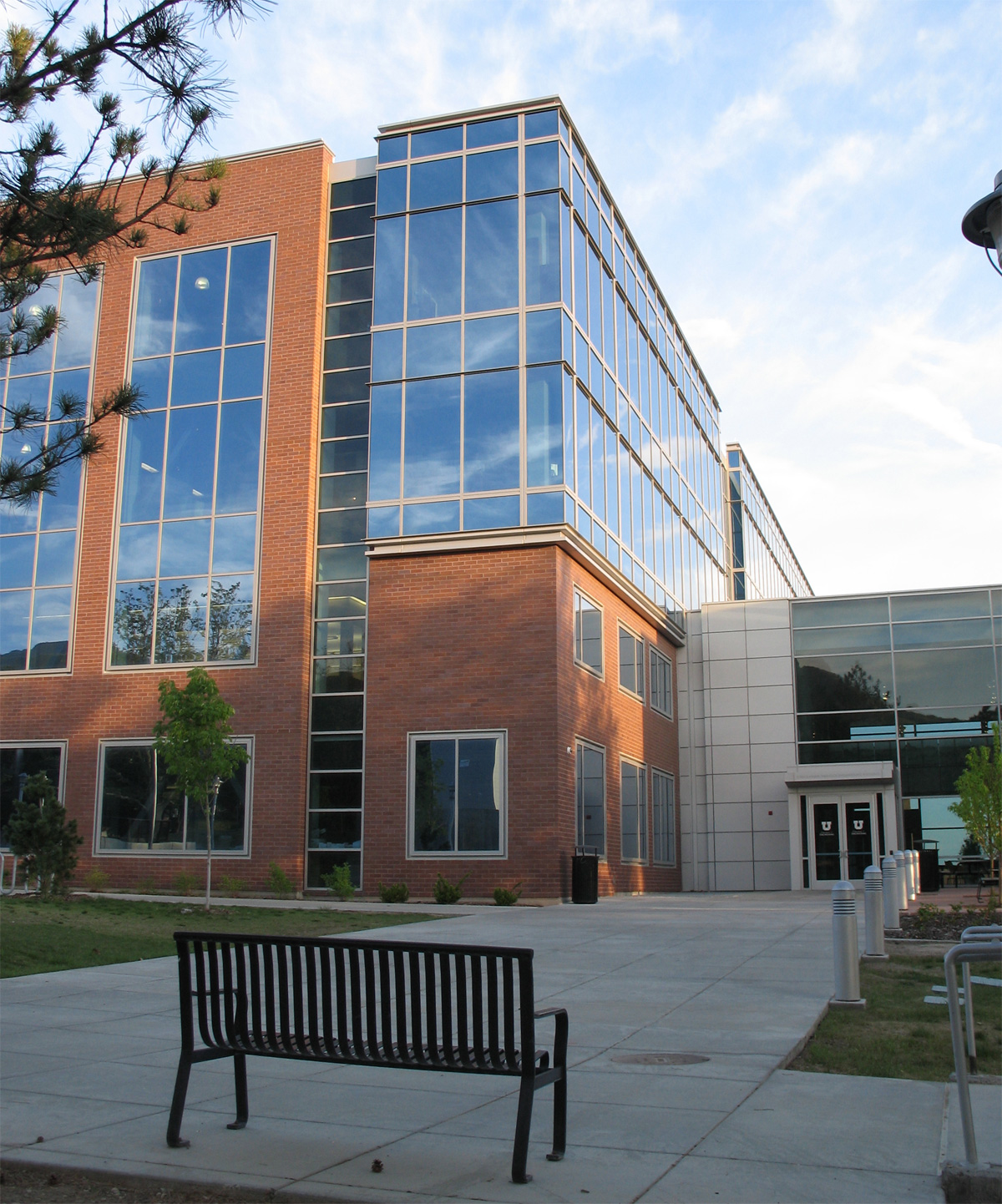
The John and Marva Warnock Engineering Building from the North.

=== Warnock Engineering Building ===
The John and Marva Warnock Engineering building (referred to as the WEB) houses the offices of the College of Engineering. It also is the home of the Scientific Computing and Imaging Institute and numerous classrooms and study rooms. The building was named after noted computer scientist Dr. John E. Warnock and his wife Marva Warnock, both of whom graduated from the University of Utah. Dr. Warnock pioneered the development of world-renowned graphics, publishing, Web and electronic document technologies and co-founded Adobe Systems Inc. in 1982. The Warnocks' major donation in 2003 enabled completion of the 100,000-square-foot Warnock Engineering Building in 2007. Some additional funding for the project came from the George S. and Dolores Dore Eccles Foundation. Construction on the building was completed in 2007.

The Scientific Computing and Imaging Institute is located in the WEB.

The primary goal for building the WEB was to provide study space for students. The building is composed mainly of study rooms, classrooms, computer labs, and open spaces. The WEB is also home to the College of Engineering Dean's Office.

=== Civil and Materials Engineering ===
The Civil and Materials Engineering Building (referred to as the CME) is home to the Materials Science and Engineering Department and the Civil and Environmental Engineering Department.

=== Kennecott Building ===
The Kennecott Building (referred to as Kenn) was built with generous support from Kennecott, operator of the Bingham Canyon Mine.

The Kennecott Building currently serves as classroom and lab space for the Mechanical Engineering Department. However, starting in 2012, the Kennecott building will be undergoing major renovations and expansions in a four-phase plan to move the entire department over to the new Kennecott building. The first phase will be completed in late 2013. After construction is complete, the Kennecott Building will house the entire Mechanical Engineering Department.

=== Floyd and Jeri Meldrum Civil Engineering Building ===
The Floyd and Jeri Meldrum Civil Engineering Building (referred to as the MCE) is a 14,500-square-foot addition to the former Energy and Minerals Research Building. It brings together civil, environmental, and nuclear engineering faculty into adjacent space with a newly designed transportation operations center and environmental engineering labs. The construction of the building was supported by a generous $3.3 million gift from Floyd and Jeri Meldrum of Las Vegas.

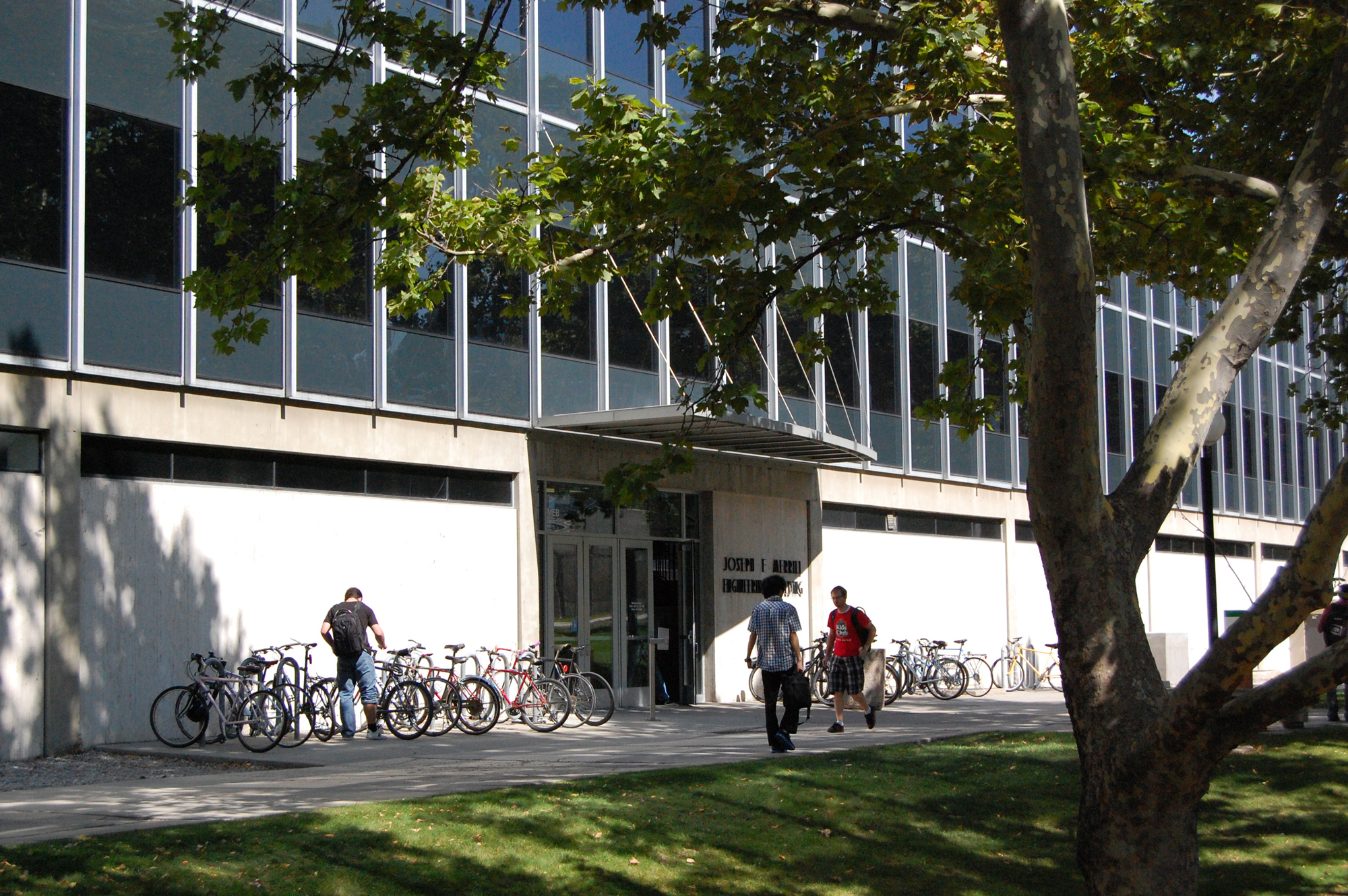
The Joseph F. Merrill Engineering Building from the South.

=== Merrill Engineering Building ===
The Merrill Engineering building (referred to as the MEB) is named after Joseph F. Merrill who became the first principal of the College of Engineering. The first phase of construction on the Merrill Engineering Building was completed in 1960 and it served as the main building for the College of Engineering until the John and Marva Warnock Engineering building was completed. The building still houses most of the student and research labs used by the college of engineering.

The MEB also houses a TRIGA nuclear reactor 25 feet below ground level in a double-wall reactor tank filled with water that has been operating since 1975. The reactor was featured in a report by ABC in 2005 about the security concerns with university research reactors. ABC felt that the security was inadequate, but that has been disputed by many other sources.

The MEB is home to the School of Computing, the Electrical and Computer Engineering Department, and the Chemical Engineering Department. It also has various classrooms, student labs, and student work areas.

=== James LeVoy Sorenson Molecular Biotechnology Building ===
The James LeVoy Sorenson Molecular Biotechnology Building (referred to as the SMBB), completed in 2012, is a 200,000-square-foot, $150 Million USTAR facility that supports research in medicine, pharmacy, engineering, microfluidics, computer science and life sciences. The building is physically located between the College of Health Sciences on the upper campus and the College of Engineering on the lower campus to serve as a research complex that connects faculty in multidisciplinary research areas between the two colleges.

== Notable alumni ==
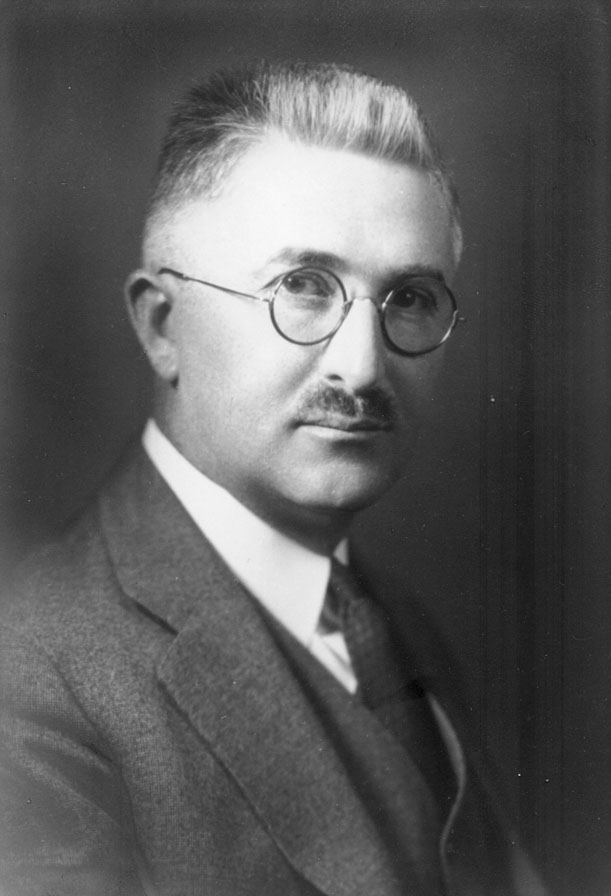
Ralph Hartley

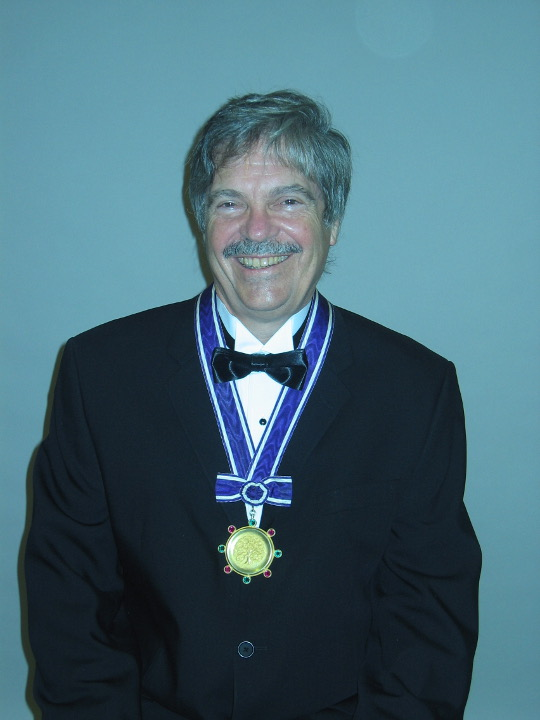
Alan C. Kay - Receiving the Kyoto Prize in 2004

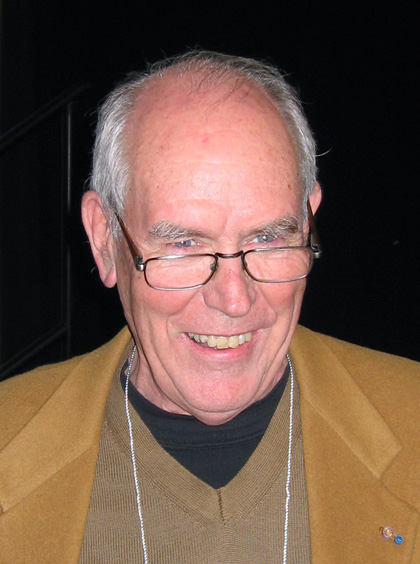
Ivan Sutherland

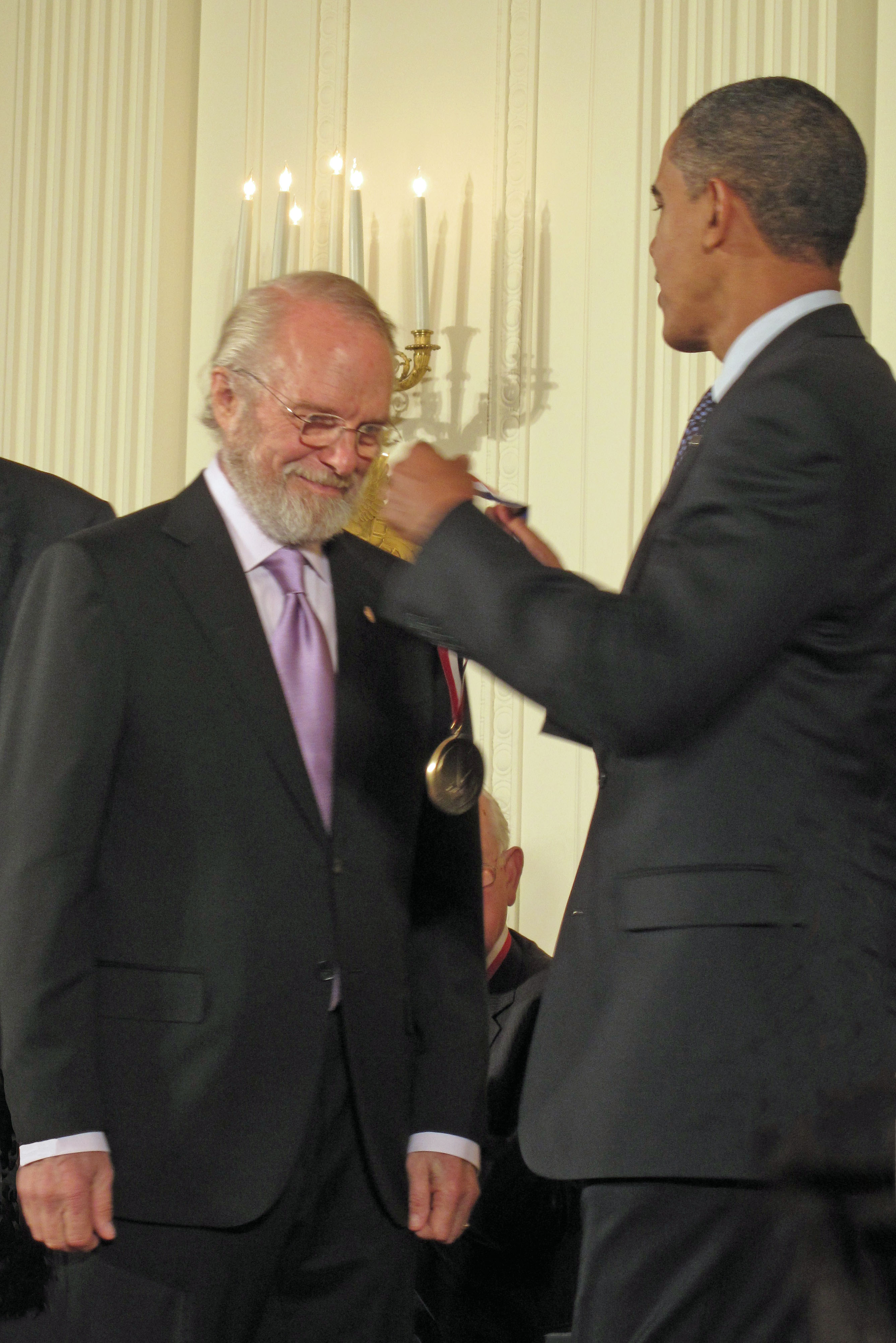
John E. Warnock - Receiving the National Medal of Technology and Innovation in 2009

Notable College of Engineering Alumni and Faculty

=== Civil and Environmental Engineering ===
- Mark Fuller - CEO and co-founder of WET (Water Entertainment Technologies), an architectural water design firm that has internationally recognized performing water features in more than 20 countries.
- Theodore "Ted" Jacobsen — Led Jacobsen Construction for 30 years, building Utah icons such as the Jon M. Huntsman Center and the Grand America Hotel.
- Paul Hirst, P.E. — President and CEO of civil engineering firm Caldwell Richards Sorensen. Named distinguished alumnus in 2012.

=== Electrical Engineering ===
- Cleon Anderson - Former President and CEO of the Institute of Electrical and Electronics Engineers (IEEE).
- Nolan Bushnell - Founder of Atari and Chuck E. Cheese, he has been inducted into the Video Game Hall of Fame and the Consumer Electronics Association Hall of Fame. He was also named one of Newsweek's "50 Men That Changed America."
- David Evans - Computer scientist and graphics pioneer and co-founder of Evans & Sutherland
- Ralph Hartley - Co-founder of Information Theory (along with Shannon and Hamming), inventor of Hartley Transform and Hartley Oscillator, IEEE Medal of Honor recipient
- Akhlesh Lakhtakia - developed visualization technique for latent fingerprints in forensics
- Calvin Quate - One of the inventors of the atomic force microscope and recipient of the IEEE Medal of Honor
- Simon Ramo - The father of the intercontinental ballistic missile (ICBM) and partly responsible for the formation of two Fortune 500 companies
- John Warnock - Computer scientist, co-founder of Adobe Systems, Inc.. Primary inventor of the PDF, Adobe Illustrator, and PostScript, together enabling desktop publishing. Recipient National Medal of Technology and Innovation, Marconi Prize, ACM Software System Award, BCS Lovelace Medal, IEEE Computer Entrepreneur Award
- Mary Jesse - wireless pioneer, executive and board member, entrepreneur, inventor and Professional Engineer (PE).
- Thomas Stockham - Father of digital recording, recipient of Grammy, Emmy and IEE fellowship. Led White House investigation team during Watergate scandal.

=== Mechanical Engineering ===
- Joseph Majdalani — Hugh and Loeda Francis Chair in Aerospace Engineering at Auburn University, Fellow of the American Society of Mechanical Engineers
- Gretchen W. McClain — President and CEO of Xylem Inc., former NASA Deputy Associate Administrator for Space Development
- Zane Beadles — Plays in the National Football League (NFL) as guard and tackle.

=== School of Computing ===
- Robert Adamson - Computer scientist. Developed Gener/OL, one of the first interpretive languages.
- Alan Ashton - Computer scientist, co-founder of WordPerfect and Thanksgiving Point
- Brian A. Barsky - Professor at the University of California, Berkeley working in computer graphics and geometric modeling as well as in optometry and vision science.
- Jim Blinn - Computer scientist and MacArthur Fellow, known for his work on Carl Sagan's Cosmos documentary and inventing the first method for representing surface textures in graphical images.
- Edwin Catmull - An Academy Award winning computer scientist and current president of Walt Disney Animation Studios and Pixar Animation Studios.
- Jim Clark - Computer scientist, prolific entrepreneur and founder of several technology companies, including Silicon Graphics, Inc., Netscape Communications Corporation, myCFO and Healtheon
- Frank Crow - Computer scientist, developed anti-aliasing methods for computer graphics
- Henri Gouraud, Computer scientist, inventor of Gouraud shading
- Jim Kajiya - Computer scientist, developed the frame buffer concept for storing and displaying single-raster images and the rendering equation.
- Alan Kay - Computer scientist, recipient of the Turing Award, credited with the concept of the Laptop computer.
- Martin Newell - Computer scientist and graphics pioneer best known as the creator of the Utah Teapot
- Fred Parke - creator of the first CG physically modeled human face
- Bui Tuong Phong, Computer scientist, inventor of the Phong reflection model and the Phong shading interpolation method
- Telle Whitney, CEO and President of the Anita Borg Institute for Women and Technology

== Notable faculty ==
- Donald A. Dahlstrom - elected member of the National Academy of Engineering for his work on liquid-solids separation with the hydrocyclone
- David Evans - founder of the computer science department at the U, graphics pioneer and co-founder of Evans & Sutherland
- George R. Hill III - one time Dean of the College of Mines and Mineral Industries; held the Envirotech Professorship in Chemical Engineering in 1977
- Stephen Jacobsen - Distinguished professor and founder of Sarcos, a robotics company that is now part of Raytheon
- Willem Johan Kolff - the father of artificial organs, pioneer of hemodialysis as well as artificial organs
- Suhas Patil - Computer scientist, prolific entrepreneur and founder of Cirrus Logic, a fabless semiconductor company.
- Ivan Sutherland - Winner of the Turing Award in 1988 for Sketchpad, co-founder of Evans and Sutherland
- Thomas Stockham - founder of Soundstream Inc., one of the experts selected to investigate President Richard Nixon's White House tapes.
- Alexandra Illmer Forsythe - author of the first computer science textbook.

== College Deans ==
College of Engineering Deans:	Tenure	Bio
Joseph F. Merrill	1897–1928	Before becoming dean of the College of Engineering, Merrill was the director of the State School of Mines. The first modern four-year engineering degree at the school was introduced in 1895 with Joseph F. Merrill as the first principal. The first department of engineering was organized in 1896 with Merrill as the first dean.
Richard B. Ketchum	1928–1939	Richard Ketchum joined the University of Utah in 1910 and became the second Chair of the Civil Engineering Department in 1919. He joined the Engineering Experiment Station in 1922 prior to serving as Dean.
Albert L. Taylor	1939–1952	Taylor joined the University of Utah in 1923 as an associate professor of mechanical engineering. Before becoming dean, he taught courses in automotive engineering and continued to serve as a professor of electrical engineering during his tenure.
Steven Kistler	1952–1965	Kistler is best known as the inventor of aerogels, the lightest known solid materials.
Max L. Williams	1965–1973	Williams recruited key faculty members including Willem J. Kolff, Thomas Stockham and David Evans. He also cleared the way for the Computer Science Division of Electrical Engineering, which ultimately became the School of Computing. Credited as a pioneer of fracture mechanics, Williams oversaw the Interdisciplinary Institute for Materials Research, leading to the Department of Materials Science and Engineering.
Wayne S. Brown	1973–1978	Brown was a professor of mechanical engineering prior to becoming the dean of the college. He is the founder of TerraTek a geomechanics measurement and analysis company, which was purchased by Schlumberger in 2006. He is also the founder of the Utah Innovation Foundation, which is now called the Wayne Brown Institute, that helps develop early stage companies.
Laurence H. Lattman	1978–1983	Lattman's educational and professional background, which include chemical engineering and geology, enabled him to concurrently serve as dean for both the College of Engineering and the College of Mines and Mineral Industries.
Joseph D. Andrade	1983–1987	Andrade joined the University of Utah in 1969 as an assistant professor in materials science and engineering. Prior to becoming dean, he served as a faculty member in both bioengineering and materials science and engineering, as well as chair for the Department of Bioengineering.
David W. Pershing	1987–1998	Pershing joined the University of Utah as an assistant professor of chemical engineering in 1977. While serving as dean from 1987–1998, he was appointed acting vice president of academic affairs in 1997. In 1998, he became the university's senior vice president for academic affairs and in 2012, Pershing became the University of Utah's 15th president.
Gerald B. Stringfellow	1998–2003	With expertise in semiconductors, Stringfellow joined the university as a professor of electrical engineering and materials science and engineering in 1980. From 1982–1985, he served as chair of the Department of Materials Science and Engineering — a position he would hold again from 1994–1998 before becoming dean. Stringfellow, Distinguished Professor in both the Department of Electrical and Computer Engineering and the Department of Materials Science and Engineering, is also a member of the National Academy of Engineering.
Richard B. Brown	2004–Present	Brown joined as dean in 2004, and also serves a professor in both the School of Computing and the Department of Electrical and Computer Engineering, as well as an adjunct professor in the Department of Bioengineering. Collaborating with alumni, academic, business and governmental leaders, Brown continues to build on his predecessor's efforts to expand the College's infrastructure, departments and academic programs.
