= Christopher R. Johnson =

American computer scientist

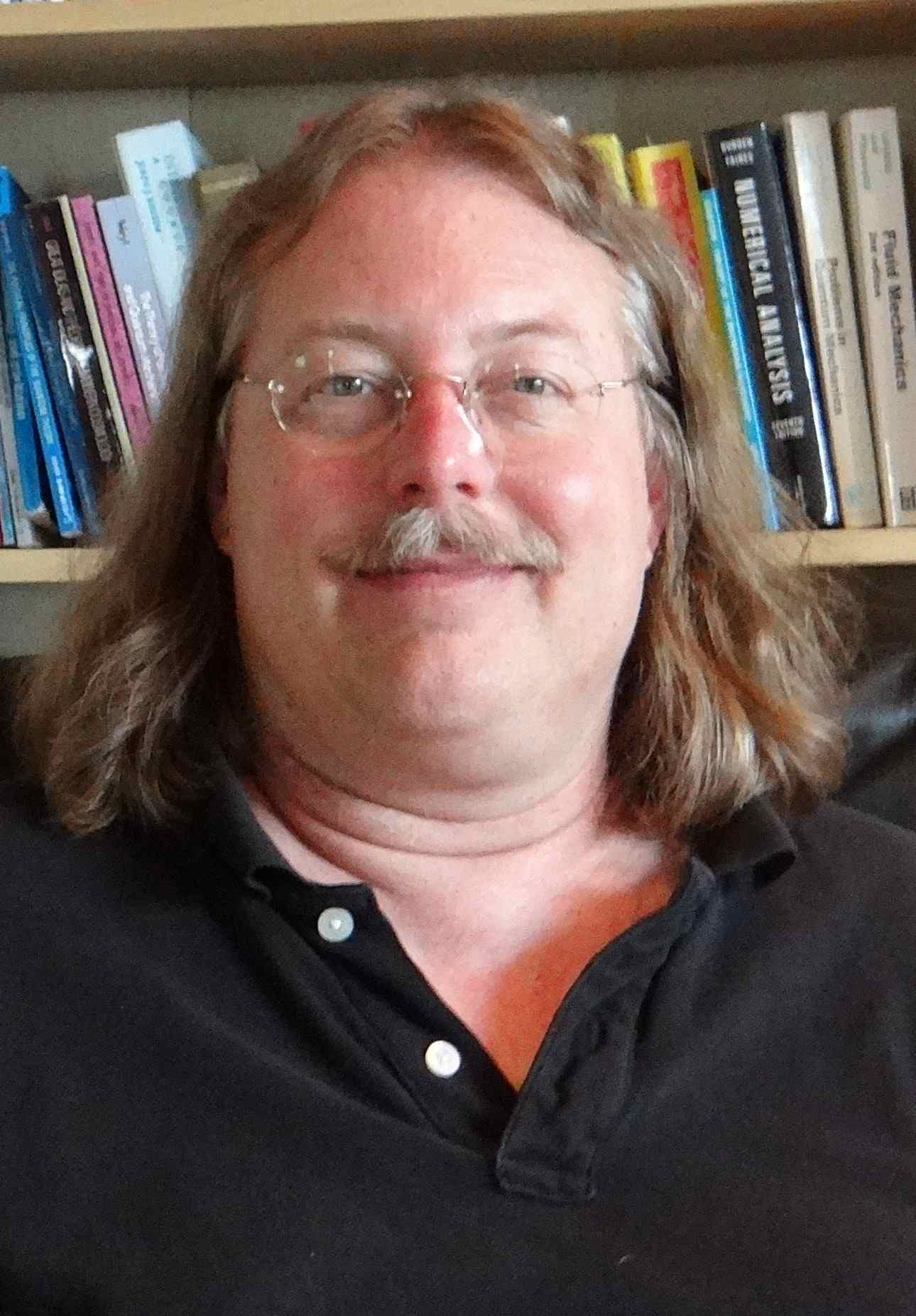
- Born: January 17, 1960 (age 66)
- Citizenship: United States
- Education: Wright State University; University of Utah
- Known for: Founding director of the Scientific Computing and Imaging Institute; Co-editor of The Visualization Handbook
- Spouse: Katharine Coles
- Scientific career
- Fields: Computer Science; Medical imaging Scientific visualization
- Workplaces: University of Utah
- Thesis: The Generalized Inverse Problem in Electrocardiography: Theoretical, Computational, and Experimental Results (1990)
- Doctoral advisor: Robert L. Lux
- Doctoral students: David M. Beazley; Gordon Kindlmann

Christopher Ray Johnson (born January 17, 1960, in Kansas City, Kansas) is an American computer scientist. He is a distinguished professor of computer science at the University of Utah, and founding director of the Scientific Computing and Imaging Institute (SCI). His research interests are in the areas of scientific computing and scientific visualization.

== Biography ==
Johnson received his BS in physics in 1982 from the Wright State University, and his MS in physics in 1984, and his PhD in medical biophysics in 1990, both from the University of Utah, in Salt Lake City.

From 1985 to 1989, Johnson was an assistant professor of physics at Westminster College (Utah). In 1990, Johnson joined the University of Utah, first as a research assistant professor of internal medicine at the Nora Eccles Harrison Cardiovascular Research and Training Institute (CVRTI) and has held faculty positions in the departments of mathematics, bioengineering, physics, and computer science. In 1996 he was appointed associate professor and associate chairman in the department of computer science. In 2003, Johnson was promoted to the rank of distinguished professor of computer science at the University of Utah and served as the director of the University of Utah School of Computing. Johnson served as the director of the ACCESS Program for Women in Science and Mathematics between 1993 and 1993 and a member of the ACCESS Faculty until 2003. In 1999 he founded and directed the Engineering Scholars Program until 2004.

In 1992 Johnson founded the Scientific Computing and Imaging (SCI) research group at the University of Utah, which has since grown to become the Scientific Computing and Imaging Institute (SCI Institute) employing over 200 faculty, staff, and students. Johnson serves on several international journal editorial boards, as well as on advisory boards to several national and international research centers. In 2013 Johnson was elected to the board of directors of the Computing Research Association (CRA) and in 2012 Johnson was selected as a member of the executive committee of the IEEE Computer Society Technical Committee on Visualization and Graphics.

Johnson serves on several international journal editorial boards, as well as on advisory boards to several national and international research centers.

Awards

- 1992, Young Investigator's (FIRST) Award from the NIH
- 1994, the NSF Presidential Young Investigator Award
- 1995, the NSF Presidential Faculty Fellow (PFF) award from President Clinton.
- 1996, a DoE Computational Science Award,
- 1997, the Par Excellence Award from the University of Utah Alumni Association and the Presidential Teaching Scholar Award.
- 1999, the Utah Governor's Medal for Science and Technology from Governor Michael Leavitt.
- 2003, the Distinguished Professor Award from the University of Utah.
- 2004, elected a Fellow of the American Institute for Medical and Biological Engineering.
- 2005, was elected a Fellow of the American Association for the Advancement of Science.
- 2009, elected a Fellow of the Society for Industrial and Applied Mathematics (SIAM), and received the Utah Cyber Pioneer Award.
- 2010, the Rosenblatt Prize for Excellence from the University of Utah and the IEEE Visualization Career Award
- 2012, the IEEE Computer Society Charles Babbage Award.
- 2013, the IEEE Computer Society Sidney Fernbach Award "For outstanding contributions and pioneering work introducing computing, simulation, and visualization into many areas of biomedicine."
- 2014, elected an IEEE Fellow in recognition of his leadership in scientific computing and scientific visualization.

== Selected publications ==
Books

- Hansen, Charles D.; M., Chen; Johnson, Christopher R.; A.E., Kaufman; H., Hagen (2014). Scientific Visualization: Uncertainty, Multifield, Biomedical, and Scalable Visualization. Mathematics and Visualization. Springer. ISBN 978-1-4471-6496-8.
- Hansen, Charles D.; Johnson, Christopher R. (2005). C.D. Hansen; C.R. Johnson (eds.). The Visualization Handbook. Elsevier. ISBN 978-0-12-387582-2.

Articles

- M. Kern, A. Lex, N. Gehlenborg, and C.R. Johnson. Interactive Visual Exploration and Refinement of Cluster Assignments. Journal of BMC Bioinformatics, vol. 18, no. 406, https://doi.org/10.1186/s12859-017-1813-7, 2017.
- M. Chen, G. Grinstein, C.R. Johnson, J. Kennedy, and M. Tory. Pathways for Theoretical Advances in Visualization. IEEE Computer Graphics and Applications, pp. 103–112, July, 2017.
- M. Larsen, K. Moreland, C.R. Johnson, and H. Childs. Optimizing Multi-Image Sort-Last Parallel Rendering. Proceedings of the IEEE Symposium on Large Data Analysis and Visualization, pp. 37–46, 2016.
- B. Hollister, G. Duffley, C. Butson, and C.R. Johnson. Visualization for Understanding Uncertainty in Activation Volumes for Deep Brain Stimulation, in Proceedings of the IEEE Eurographics Conference on Visualization (EuroVis) 2016, Editors: K.L. Ma G. Santucci, and J. van Wijk, pp. 37–41, 2016.
- P. Rosen, B. Burton, K. Potter, C.R. Johnson. muView: A Visual Analysis System for Exploring Uncertainty in Myocardial Ischemia Simulations, In Visualization in Medicine and Life Sciences III, Edited by L. Linsen, B. Hamann, and H.C. Hege, Springer, pp. 45–65. 2016.
- X. Tong, J. Edwards, C. Chen, H. Shen, C. R. Johnson, P. Wong. View-Dependent Streamline Deformation and Exploration, In IEEE Transactions on Visualization and Computer Graphics, vol. 22, no. 7, pp. 1788–1801, 2016
- H. De Sterck, C.R. Johnson. Data Science: What Is It and How Is It Taught?, In SIAM News, SIAM, July, 2015.
- Genton, M.G.; Johnson, Christopher R.; Potter, Kristi P.; Stenchikov, G.; Sun, Y. (2014). "Surface boxplots" (PDF). Stat Journal. Vol. 3, no. 1. pp. 1–11.
- Jiao, F.; Phillips, J.M.; Gur, Y.; Johnson, Christopher R. (2013). "Uncertainty Visualization in HARDI based on Ensembles of ODFs" (PDF). Proceedings of 2013 IEEE Pacific Visualization Symposium. pp. 193–200. PMC 3898522. PMID 24466504.
- Wang, D.; Kirby, Robert M.; MacLeod, Robert S.; Johnson, Christopher R. (2013). "Inverse Electrocardiographic Source Localization of Ischemia: An Optimization Framework and Finite Element Solution" (PDF). Journal of Computational Physics. 250. Academic Press: 403–424. Bibcode:2013JCoPh.250..403W. doi:10.1016/j.jcp.2013.05.027. ISSN 0021-9991. PMC 3727301. PMID 23913980.
- Johnson, Christopher R. (2012). "Biomedical Visual Computing: Case Studies and Challenges" (PDF). Computing in Science & Engineering. Vol. 14, no. 1. pp. 12–21. PMC 3336198. PMID 22545005.
- Potter, Kristi P.; Kirby, Robert M.; Xiu, D.; Johnson, Christopher R. (2012). "Interactive visualization of probability and cumulative density functions" (PDF). International Journal for Uncertainty Quantification. 2 (4): 397–412. doi:10.1615/Int.J.UncertaintyQuantification.2012004074. PMC 3609671. PMID 23543120.
- Wong, P.C.; Wong, H.-W.; Shen, H.-W.; Johnson, Christopher R.; Chen, C.; Ross, R.B. (July 2012). "The Top 10 Challenges in Extreme-Scale Visual Analytics" (PDF). IEEE Computer Graphics and Applications. 32 (4): 63–67. Bibcode:2012ICGA...32d..63R. doi:10.1109/MCG.2012.87. PMC 3907777. PMID 24489426.
- Johnson, Christopher R. (July 2004). "Top Scientific Visualization Research Problems" (PDF). IEEE Computer Graphics and Applications. Vol. 24, no. 4. pp. 13–17.
- Johnson, Christopher R.; Sanderson, Allen R. (September 2003). "A Next Step: Visualizing Errors and Uncertainty" (PDF). IEEE Computer Graphics and Applications. Vol. 23, no. 5. pp. 6–10.
- Parker, Steven G.; Johnson, Christopher R. (1995). "SCIRun" (PDF). Proceedings of the 1995 ACM/IEEE conference on Supercomputing (CDROM) - Supercomputing '95. pp. 52–es. doi:10.1145/224170.224354. ISBN 978-0897918169. S2CID 2987813.
- Livnat, Yarden; Shen, Han-Wei; Johnson, Christopher R. (1996). "A near optimal isosurface extraction algorithm using the span space" (PDF). IEEE Transactions on Visualization and Computer Graphics. 2 (1): 73–84. doi:10.1109/2945.489388. Archived from the original (PDF) on 2003-10-01.
- Shen, H. W.; Hansen, C. D.; Livnat, Y.; Johnson, Christopher R. (October 1996). "Isosurfacing in span space with utmost efficiency (ISSUE)" (PDF). Proceedings of the 7th Conference on Visualization'96. IEEE Computer Society Press: 287–ff.
- Parker, Steven G.; Weinstein, David M.; Johnson, Christopher R. (1997). "The SCIRun Computational Steering Software System" (PDF). Modern Software Tools for Scientific Computing. Boston: Birkhäuser. pp. 5–44. CiteSeerX 10.1.1.40.9989. doi:10.1007/978-1-4612-1986-6_1. ISBN 978-1-4612-7368-4.

Reports

- Chen, J.; Choudhary, A.; Feldman, S.; Hendrickson, B.; Johnson, Christopher R.; Mount, R.; Sarkar, V.; White, V.; Williams, D. (March 2013). Synergistic Challenges in Data-Intensive Science and Exascale Computing (PDF) (DOE ASCAC Data Subcommittee Report). Department of Energy Office of Science. Archived from the original (PDF) on 2014-11-29.
- Keyes, D.; Taylor, V.; Hey, T.; Feldman, S.; Allen, G.; Colella, P.; Cummings, P.; Darema, F.; Dongarra, J.; Dunning, T.; Ellisman, M.; Foster, I.; Gropp, W.; Johnson, Christopher R.; Kamath, C.; Madduri, R.; Mascagni, M.; Parker, Steven G.; Raghavan, P.; Trefethen, A.; Valcourt, S.; Patra, A.; Choudhury, F.; Cooper, C.; McCartney, P.; Parashar, M.; Russell, T.; Schneider, B.; Schopf, J.; Sharp, N. (2011). Advisory Committee for CyberInfrastructure Task Force on Software for Science and Engineering (PDF) (Report). National Science Foundation. Archived from the original (PDF) on 2014-11-29.
- Oden, J.T.; Ghattas, O.; King, J.L.; Schneider, B.I.; Bartschat, K.; Darema, F.; Drake, J.; Dunning, T.; Estep, D.; Glotzer, S.; Gurnis, M.; Johnson, Christopher R.; Katz, D.S.; Keyes, D.; Kiesler, S.; Kim, S.; Kinter, J.; Klimeck, G.; McCurdy, C.W.; Moser, R.; Ott, C.; Patra, A.; Petzold, L.; Schlick, T.; Schulten, K.; Stodden, V.; Tromp, J.; Wheeler, M.; Winter, S.J.; Wu, C.; Yelick, K. (2011). Cyber Science and Engineering: A Report of the National Science Foundation Advisory Committee for Cyberinfrastructure Task Force on Grand Challenges (PDF) (Report). National Science Foundation. Archived from the original (PDF) on 2014-11-29.
- Ellisman, M.; Stevens, R.; Colvin, M.; Schlick, T.; Delong, E.; Olsen, G.; George, J.; Karniakadis, G.; Johnson, Christopher R.; Sematova, N. (August 2009). Scientific Grand Challenges: Opportunities in biology at the Extreme Scale of Computing (PDF) (Report). Department of Energy. Archived from the original (PDF) on 2014-11-29.
- Johnson, Christopher R.; Ross, R.; Ahern, S.; Ahrens, J.; Bethel, W.; Ma, K.L.; Papka, M.; van Rosendale, J.; Shen, H.W.; Thomas, J. (October 2007). DOE Visualization and Knowledge Discovery: Report from the DOE/ASCR Workshop on Visual Analysis and Data Exploration at Extreme Scale (PDF) (Report). Department of Energy. Archived from the original (PDF) on 2014-11-29.
- Reed, D.; Johnson, Christopher R. (2007). CRA-NIH Computing Research Challenges in Biomedicine Workshop Recommendations (PDF) (Report). Computing Research Association (CRA). Archived from the original (PDF) on 2014-11-29.
- Johnson, Christopher R.; Moorhead, R.; Munzner, T.; Pfister, H.; Rheingans, P.; Yoo, T.S. (2006). NIH-NSF Visualization Research Challenges Report (PDF) (Report). IEEE Press. ISBN 0-7695-2733-7.
- Oden, J.T.; Fish, J.; Johnson, Christopher R.; Laub, A.; Srolovitz, D.; Belytschko, T.; Hughes, T.J.R.; Keys, D.; Petzold, L.; Yip, S. (2006). NSF Blue Ribbon Panel Report on Simulation Based Engineering Science (PDF) (Report). National Science Foundation. Archived from the original (PDF) on 2014-11-29.
- Reed, D.; Bajcsy, R.; Griffiths, J.M.; Dongarra, J.; Johnson, Christopher R. (June 2005). Computational Science: Ensuring America's Competitiveness (PDF) (Report). President's Information Technology Advisory Committee (PITAC). Archived from the original (PDF) on 2014-11-29.
