= Claudio Silva (computer scientist) =

Computer scientist and data scientist

- Education: Federal University of Ceará; Stony Brook University
- Occupations: Academic; Computer scientist; Data scientist
- Employer: New York University
- Organizations: New York University Tandon School of Engineering; Center for Urban Science and Progress; Courant Institute of Mathematical Sciences
- Known for: Co-developer of VisTrails
- Spouse: Juliana Freire
- Scientific career
- Doctoral advisor: Arie Kaufman

Claudio Silva is a Brazilian American computer scientist and data scientist. He is a professor of computer science and engineering at the New York University Tandon School of Engineering, the head of disciplines at the NYU Center for Urban Science and Progress (CUSP) and affiliate faculty member at NYU's Courant Institute of Mathematical Sciences. He co-developed the open-source data-exploration system VisTrails with his wife Juliana Freire and many other collaborators. He is a former chair of the executive committee for the IEEE Computer Society Technical Committee on Visualization and Graphics.

== About ==
Silva received his BS (1990) in mathematics from the Federal University of Ceará. He has his MS (1993) and PhD (1996) in computer science from the State University of New York at Stony Brook.

Silva joined NYU in July 2011. Previously, he held positions at labs including AT&T Labs, IBM Research, Sandia National Laboratory and Lawrence Livermore National Laboratory. He was also a faculty member at the Scientific Computing and Imaging Institute and Professor in the School of Computing at the University of Utah as well as a visiting professor at Linköping University in Sweden.

His research interests include visualization, visual analytics, reproducibility and provenance, geometric computing, data science/big data, sports analytics, urban computing and computer graphics. He participates in interdisciplinary projects across domains such as biotechnology, neuroscience, physics, ornithology, environmental science and urban science, collaborating with companies such as AT&T. In conjunction with the Major League Baseball Advanced Media, he co-developed an in-ballpark infrastructure designed to provide complete and reliable measurements of every play on the field in order to answer analytics questions.

He has published more than 220 peer-reviewed journal and conference papers and holds 12 U.S. patents. He received grants from institutions including the National Science Foundation, the Department of Energy, the National Institutes of Health, the Alfred P. Sloan Foundation and the Gordon and Betty Moore Foundation.

=== Recognition ===
Silva's work has received a number of awards. The VisTrails Provenance Plugin for Autodesk Maya received a 2009 Utah Innovation Award. In 2013, he was elected an Institute of Electrical and Electronics Engineers fellow and in 2014 he won the IEEE Visualization Technical Achievement Award "in recognition of seminal advances in geometric computing for visualization and for contributions to the development of the VisTrails data exploration system." UV-CDAT, a novel climate data analysis tool that he helped build, won the 2015 Federal Laboratory Consortium Interagency Partnership Award. He "was the senior technology consultant (2012--2017)" for MLB.com's Statcast player tracking system, which won the Alpha Award for Best Analytics Innovation/Technology at the 2015 MIT Sloan Sports Analytics Conference.
