= Tonio Andrade =

American historian

- Born: Tonio Adam Andrade; 1968 (age 57–58)
- Awards: Guggenheim Fellowship

Academic background
- Education: Reed College; University of Illinois Urbana-Champaign; Yale University
- Doctoral advisor: Geoffrey Parker and Jonathan D. Spence

Academic work
- Discipline: History
- Sub-discipline: Chinese history; early-modern global history
- Institutions: College at Brockport, State University of New York; Emory University
- Website: tonioandrade.com

Tonio Adam Andrade (born 1968) is an American military historian and sinologist. A historian of East Asia and the history of East Asian trading networks, he is a professor of history at Emory University.

== Biography ==
Tonio Andrade is the son of material scientist J. D. Andrade and grew up in Salt Lake City. He earned a bachelor's degree in anthropology at Reed College, and went on to study history at Yale University where he had Jonathan Spence as a dissertation advisor. He became interested in the history of China as an undergraduate student and began studying the language at that time.

In 2012 Andrade received a Guggenheim Fellowship to study the military history of the Yuan and Ming dynasties and the development of gunpowder weaponry.

== Bibliography ==
- Commerce, Culture, and Conflict: Taiwan Under European Rule, 1624–1662. Yale University Press, 2000.
- How Taiwan became Chinese: Dutch, Spanish, and Han colonization in the seventeenth century. Columbia University Press, 2008.
- The Limits of Empire: European Imperial Formations in Early Modern World History: Essays in Honor of Geoffrey Parker. Ashgate Publishing, 2013.
- Lost Colony: The Untold Story of China's First Great Victory over the West. Princeton University Press, 2013.
- The Gunpowder Age: China, Military Innovation, and the Rise of the West in World History. Princeton University Press, 2016.
- Early Modern East Asia: War, Commerce, and Cultural Exchange. Routledge, 2018.
- Sea Rovers, Silver, and Samurai: Maritime East Asia in Global History, 1550–1700. University of Hawaii Press, 2019.
- The Last Embassy: The Dutch Mission of 1795 and the Forgotten History of Western Encounters with China. Princeton University Press, 2021.

== See also ==
- Global silver trade from the 16th to 19th centuries
- Victor Lieberman
- Maritime Silk Road
- Nanban trade
- Taiwan under Qing rule
