= Rheingans =

Rheingans is a surname. Notable people with the surname include:

- Brad Rheingans (born 1953), American wrestler
- Carrie Rheingans, American politician from Michigan
- Gustave Rheingans (1890–1951), American politician and farmer
- Penny Rheingans, American computer scientist
- Rowan Rheingans, English folk musician
