= Ross T. Whitaker =

American computer scientist

- Education: Princeton University; University of North Carolina at Chapel Hill
- Known for: VISPACK
- Awards: NSF CAREER Award; IEEE Fellow (2014); AIMBE Fellow (2017)
- Scientific career
- Workplaces: Boston Consulting Group; European Computer-Industry Research Center; University of Tennessee; University of Utah; Scientific Computing and Imaging Institute
- Thesis: Geometry-Limited Diffusion (1993)
- Doctoral advisor: Stephen M. Pizer
- Doctoral students: Miriah Meyer

Ross T. Whitaker is an American computer scientist and former director of the University of Utah School of Computing.

== Biography ==
Whitaker graduated summa cum laude in electrical engineering and computer science from Princeton University in 1986. Following college, he worked for the Boston Consulting Group for two years before entering the computer science PhD program at the University of North Carolina at Chapel Hill in 1989. He graduated in 1993, after which he worked at the European Computer-Industry Research Center in Munich, Germany.

From 1996 to 2000, Whitaker was an assistant professor in the Department of Electrical Engineering at the University of Tennessee and received an NSF CAREER Award. He then moved to the University of Utah and joined the faculty at the Scientific Computing and Imaging Institute.

Whitaker was named a Fellow of the Institute of Electrical and Electronics Engineers in 2014 "for contributions to image and geometry processing, visualization, and medical image analysis". He is also a Fellow of the American Institute for Medical and Biological Engineering.
