= Ben Wolff =

American business executive

Benjamin G. Wolff
- Born: Santa Barbara, California, U.S.
- Education: California Polytechnic State University (BS); Lewis & Clark Law School (JD)
- Occupation: Business executive
- Years active: 1994–present
- Known for: Co-founding Clearwire; leadership of Sarcos Robotics and Palladyne AI
- Title: President and CEO, Palladyne AI

Benjamin G. Wolff is an American business executive and former attorney. He co-founded the wireless-broadband company Clearwire and was its president and chief executive officer during its early expansion and its combination with Sprint Nextel's WiMAX business. He later led ICO Global Communications, a satellite communications company, and co-founded the independent robotics company that acquired Raytheon's Sarcos unit in 2015. Wolff was chief executive and chairman of Sarcos from 2015 until 2021, when the company became publicly traded through a merger with a special-purpose acquisition company. He returned as president and chief executive officer in February 2024 after Sarcos discontinued its hardware-development operations to focus on artificial-intelligence software, and he led its renaming as Palladyne AI.

== Early life and education ==
Wolff was born in Santa Barbara, California, and grew up on California's Central Coast. As a teenager, he worked for an electrical contractor and established a retail business selling spas, fireplaces and wood-burning stoves. While attending college full time, he was also marketing director for an agricultural business.

Wolff studied agricultural business at California Polytechnic State University, San Luis Obispo, graduating with honors in 1991. He received a Juris Doctor, magna cum laude, from the Northwestern School of Law of Lewis & Clark College (now Lewis & Clark Law School) in 1994.

== Legal career ==
Wolff joined the law firm Davis Wright Tremaine after working there as a law clerk. He practiced at the firm from January 1994 until April 2004, focusing on mergers and acquisitions, corporate finance, venture financing and strategic alliances. He became a partner in 1998, reportedly becoming the youngest lawyer to make partner at the firm. He later co-chaired the firm's business-transactions department and was on its executive committee.

Among Wolff's clients were businesses associated with telecommunications entrepreneur Craig McCaw. Wolff stopped practicing law in 2004 to move into executive leadership.

== Career in business ==
=== Clearwire ===
In 2004, Wolff became president of Eagle River Investments, McCaw's investment organization, after having represented McCaw-related entities as outside counsel. That same year, he co-founded Clearwire and joined the company, holding various positions including executive vice president, president, co-chief executive officer and chief executive officer. He became chief executive officer in 2007.

As chief executive, Wolff was the principal public advocate for Clearwire's plan to build a national mobile-broadband network using WiMAX. In interviews and industry appearances, he argued that the company's large holdings of 2.5 GHz spectrum could support an open network and data-intensive mobile services.

Wolff helped negotiate Clearwire's 2008 combination with Sprint Nextel's Xohm WiMAX unit. The transaction created a company valued at approximately $14.5 billion and included $3.2 billion of investment from Intel, Google, Comcast, Time Warner Cable, Bright House Networks and Trilogy Equity Partners. Wolff subsequently selected and announced members of the combined company's senior management team.

Wolff was CEO until 2009, when he became co-chairman following the appointment of William Morrow as CEO. He resigned from the board in 2011.

=== ICO Global Communications ===
Wolff became acting chief executive of satellite-communications company ICO Global Communications in December 2009 and was appointed chief executive, president and chairman in February 2010. The company was subsequently renamed Pendrell Corporation and shifted its emphasis toward acquiring, managing and licensing intellectual property.

Under Wolff, Pendrell purchased a controlling interest in digital-rights-management company ContentGuard for $90.1 million in 2011 and acquired additional patent portfolios, including patents and applications from Nokia relating to flash-memory technology. He resigned as chief executive, president and a director in November 2014.

=== Sarcos and Palladyne AI ===
In January 2015, Wolff and Sarcos executive Fraser Smith led an investor group that acquired Raytheon's Sarcos robotics unit. Smith initially became chief executive and Wolff chairman. Wolff became chief executive and chairman in September 2015. He led fundraising from investors that included Microsoft, Caterpillar and GE Ventures to develop powered exoskeletons and teleoperated industrial robots intended for hazardous or physically demanding work.

In 2021, Wolff negotiated Sarcos's merger with Rotor Acquisition Corporation. The transaction valued the combined company at $1.3 billion. The merger closed in September 2021, after which Wolff was chief executive and chairman of the publicly traded company. He moved from chief executive to executive chairman in December 2021 and left that position in February 2023.

Wolff rejoined the company's management as executive vice chairman in October 2023 and became president and chief executive officer in February 2024. In March 2024, the company changed its name to Palladyne AI to reflect its software focus. In 2025, Palladyne completed several acquisitions that expanded its defense business.

== Board memberships ==
Wolff has been a director of satellite-communications company Globalstar since 2018, where he is the chair of the Board’s Strategic Review Committee. He has also been a director of Palladyne and its predecessor since 2015.

Earlier in his career, Wolff chaired DBSD North America and was on the boards of ICO Global Communications and portfolio companies associated with Eagle River Investments. He has also been on the Board of Visitors of Lewis & Clark Law School.

== Industry leadership ==
Wolff was on the board of CTIA, the trade association for the United States wireless industry. During his Clearwire tenure, he delivered presentations and interviews on WiMAX deployment, wireless-spectrum policy, open networks and mobile broadband. In the robotics field, Wolff has written about the role of human-controlled industrial robotics, including in a 2017 article for IEEE Spectrum.

== Recognition ==
The American Lawyer included Wolff in its 2003 “45 Under 45” selection of private-practice lawyers. The Portland Business Journal had previously selected him for its “Forty Under 40” program. In 2009, he was a Pacific Northwest finalist in Ernst & Young's Entrepreneur of the Year program for his work at Clearwire.
