= Scientific Computing and Imaging Institute =

Research institute at the University of Utah

Coordinates: 40°46′3.72″N 111°50′42.00″W

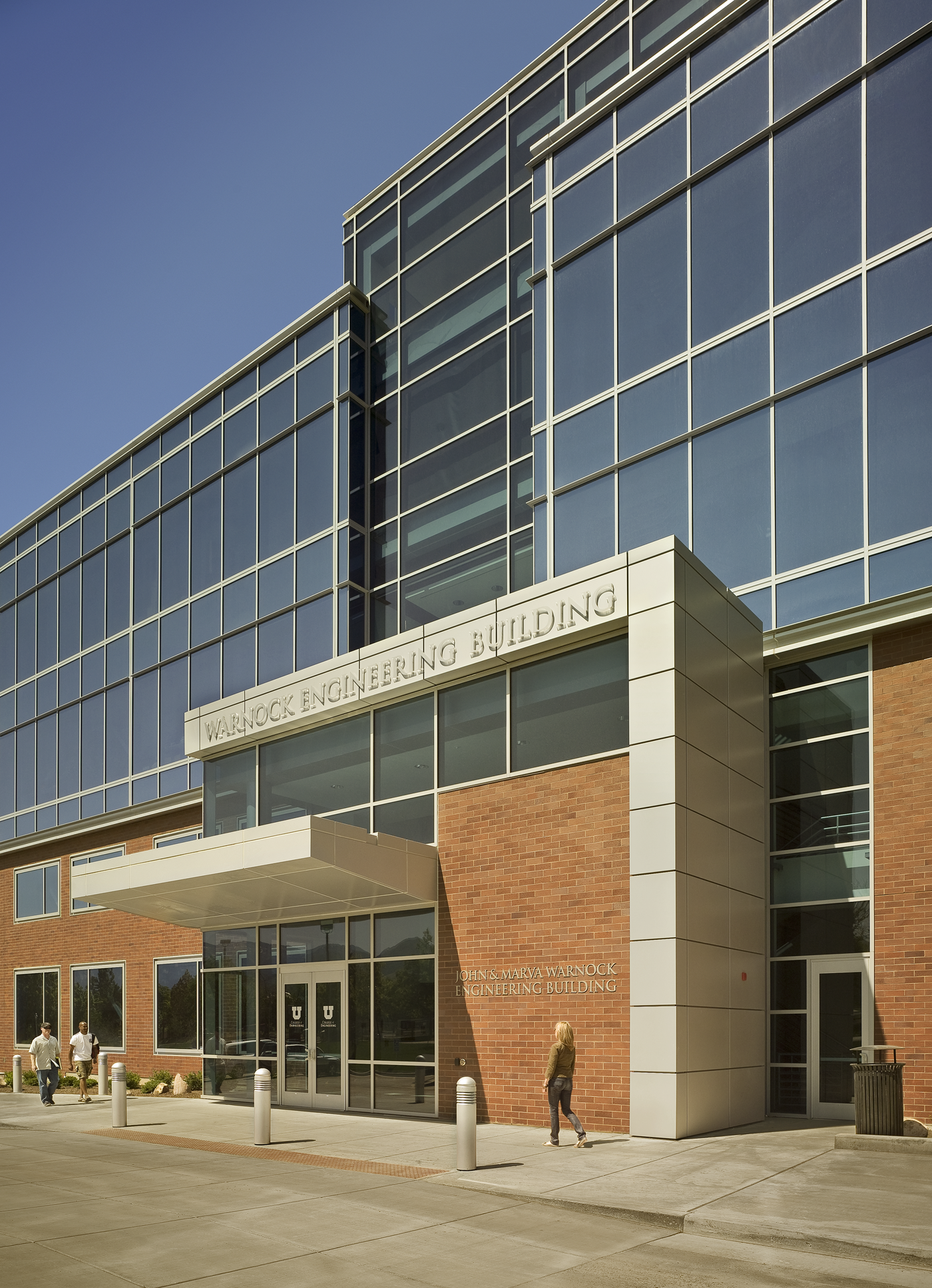
- Established: 1994
- Research type: Computer science and translational research
- Field of research: Scientific visualization, High performance computing, Image analysis
- Director: Dr. Manish Parashar
- Location: Salt Lake City, Utah
- Affiliations: University of Utah School of Computing; University of Utah School of Medicine; University of Utah College of Engineering
- Operating agency: University of Utah
- Website: www.sci.utah.edu

The Scientific Computing and Imaging (SCI) Institute is a permanent research institute at the University of Utah that focuses on the development of new scientific computing and visualization techniques, tools, and systems with primary applications to biomedical engineering. The SCI Institute is noted worldwide in the visualization community for contributions by faculty, alumni, and staff. Faculty are associated primarily with the School of Computing, Department of Bioengineering, Department of Mathematics, and Department of Electrical and Computer Engineering, with auxiliary faculty in the Medical School and School of Architecture.

== History ==
The Scientific Computing and Imaging Institute started in 1992 as a research group in the University of Utah School of Computing by Chris Johnson and Rob MacLeod. In 1994 this group became the Center for Scientific Computing and Imaging, and in 2000 the name was changed to the Scientific Computing and Imaging (SCI) Institute. In 2007, the SCI Institute was awarded funding from USTAR to recruit more faculty in medical imaging technology. The SCI Institute was recognized as an NVIDIA CUDA Center of Excellence in 2008. In 2011, USTAR funding allowed faculty recruitment for genomic signal processing and information visualization. in 2014, Intel partnered with the SCI Institute to form the Intel Parallel Computing Center for Scientific Rendering to research and develop large scale and in situ visualization techniques for Intel hardware.

== Research ==
The overarching research objective of the Scientific Computing and Imaging Institute is to conduct application-driven research in the creation of new scientific computing techniques, tools, and systems. Given the proximity and availability of research conducted at the University of Utah School of Medicine, a main application focus is medicine. SCI Institute researchers also apply computational techniques to scientific and engineering sub-specialties, such as fluid dynamics, biomechanics, electrophysiology, bioelectric fields, scientific visualization, parallel computing, inverse problems, and neuroimaging.

== Open source software releases ==
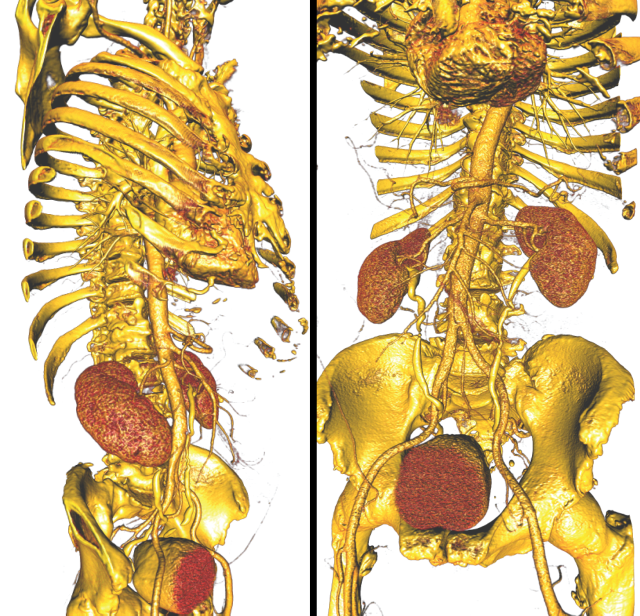
A CT scan of a human torso rendered with ImageVis3D

Volumetric data of an aorta labeled with regions of interest using Seg3D and then interactively rendered in SCIRun.

The SCI Institute releases open source software packages for many of the projects developed by researchers for use by the scientific visualization and medical imaging communities. All projects are released under the MIT software license. Notable projects released by SCI include:

- SCIRun - Problem Solving Environment (PSE), for modeling, simulation and visualization of scientific problems
- ImageVis3D - volume rendering application with multidimensional transfer function visualization support
- Seg3D - interactive image segmentation tool
- ViSUS - Visualization Streams for Ultimate Scalability
- ShapeWorks - statistical shape analysis tool that constructs compact statistical point-based models of ensembles of similar shapes that does not rely on any specific surface parameterization
- FluoRender - interactive rendering tool for confocal microscopy data visualization.
- VisTrails - scientific workflow management system.
- Cleaver - multi-material tetrahedral meshing API and application
- FEBio - nonlinear finite element solver specifically designed for biomechanical applications
- VISPACK - C++ library that includes matrix, image, and volume objects
- Teem - collection of libraries for representing, processing, and visualizing scientific raster data
- Manta Interactive Ray Tracer - interactive ray tracing environment designed for both workstations and supercomputers

== Notable researchers and alumni ==
- David M. Beazley - wrote Python Essential Reference, co-awarded the Gordon Bell Prize in 1993 and in 1998
- Juliana Freire - developed VisTrails, Fellow of the Association for Computing Machinery
- Amy Ashurst Gooch - developed Gooch shading for non-photo realistic rendering (NPR), authored first book on NPR
- Charles D. Hansen - co-editor of The Visualization Handbook
- Gordon Kindlmann - developed tensor glyphs
- Aaron Lefohn - Director of Research at NVIDIA
- Miriah Meyer - TED Fellow and MIT Technology Review TR35 listee, pioneer in interactive visualization for basic research
- Erik Reinhard - Distinguished Scientist at Technicolor Research and Innovation, founder and Editor-in-Chief for ACM Transactions on Applied Perception
- Theresa-Marie Rhyne - founding director of the SIGGRAPH Cartographic Visualization Project and the Environmental Protection Agency Scientific Visualization Center
- Peter Shirley - Distinguished Scientist at NVIDIA recognized for contributions to real time ray tracing
- Claudio Silva - chair of IEEE Computer Society Technical Committee on Visualization and Graphics, developed VisTrails
- Peter-Pike Sloan - developed the precomputed radiance transfer rendering method
- Ross Whitaker - director of the University of Utah School of Computing and IEEE Fellow
