= Katharine Coles =

American poet and educator

- Education: University of Washington (BA); University of Houston; University of Utah (PhD)
- Occupations: Poet, professor
- Spouse: Christopher R. Johnson
- Writing career
- Notable work: The Golden Years of the Fourth Dimension
- Notable awards: PEN New Writers Award; Guggenheim Fellowship

Katharine Coles is an American poet and educator. She served from 2006 to 2012 as Utah's third poet laureate and currently serves as the inaugural director of the Harriet Monroe Poetry Institute and the co-director of the Utah Symposium in Science and Literature.

== Biography ==
Coles earned her Bachelor of Arts from the University of Washington. She later earned a master's degree from the University of Houston and her Ph.D. from the University of Utah. In 1997 she joined the faculty at the University of Utah.

Her published works include the novels Fire Season and The Measurable World, and five collections of poems: Fault, The Golden Years of the Fourth Dimension, A History of the Garden, The One Right Touch, and Flight. She has also contributed stories, poems, and essays to The Paris Review, The New Republic, The Kenyon Review, Image, Upstreet, and Poetry.

== Awards and honors ==
Coles received the PEN New Writer’s Award in 1992. Her 2001 poetry collection, The Golden Years of the Fourth Dimension, received the Utah Book Award. In 2012, she was awarded a Guggenheim Fellowship.

== Selected works ==
=== Biography/Memoir ===
- Look Both Ways, 2018

=== Novels ===
- The Measurable World, 1995
- Fire Season, 2005

=== Poetry ===
- The One Right Touch, 1992
- The Golden Years of the Fourth Dimension, 2001
- Fault, 2008
- The Earth Is Not Flat, 2013
- Flight, 2016
- Wayward, 2019
- Sestina in Prose
