= Theresa-Marie Rhyne =

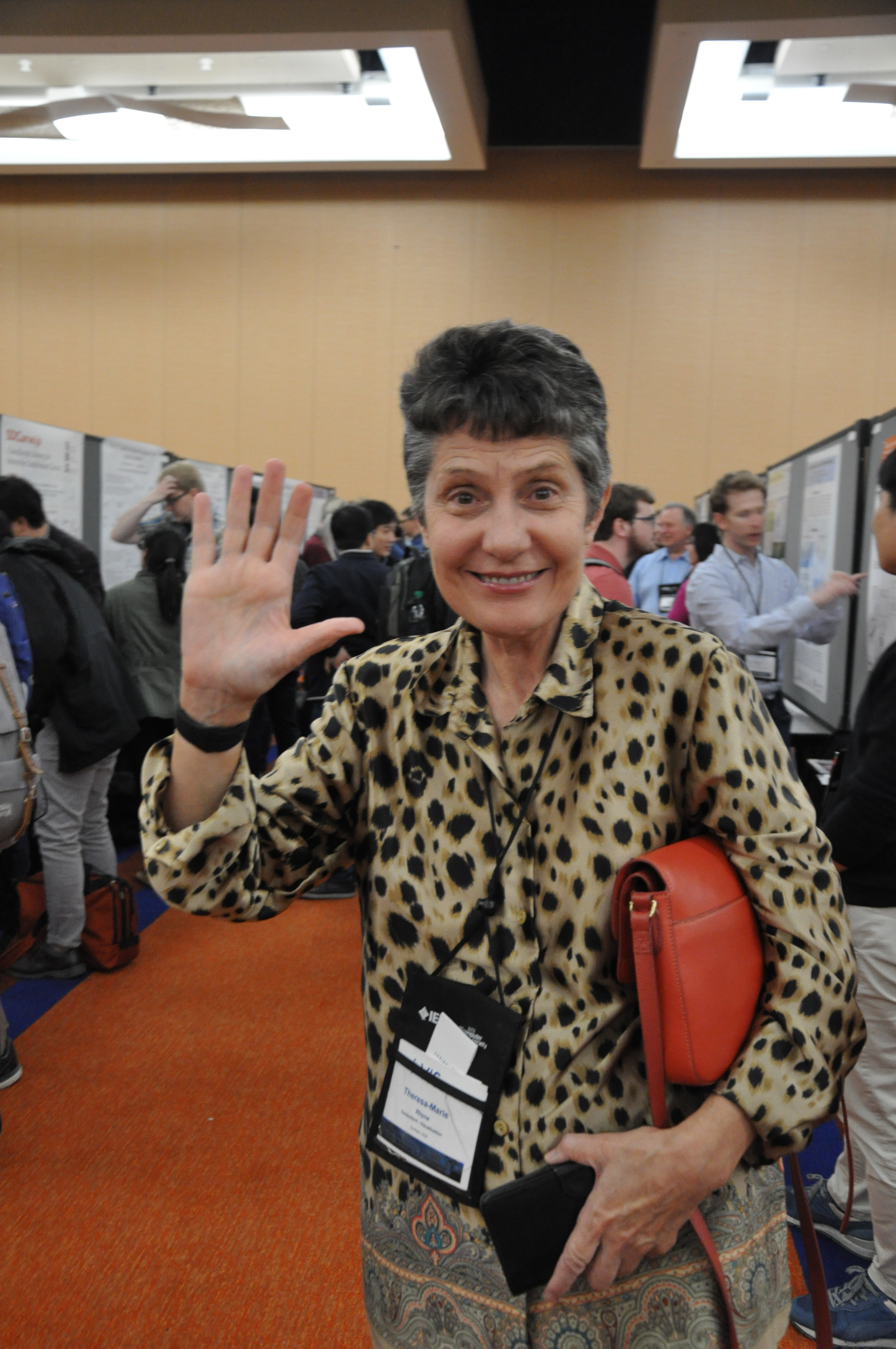
Theresa-Marie Rhyne

Theresa-Marie Rhyne is an expert in the field of computer-generated visualization and a consultant who specializes in applying artistic color theories to visualization and digital media. She has consulted with the Stanford University Visualization Group on a color suggestion prototype system (2013), the Center for Visualization at the University of California, Davis (2013), the Scientific Computing and Imaging Institute at the University of Utah (2010 - 2012) & (2014) on applying color theory to ensemble data visualization and the Advanced Research Computing Unit at Virginia Tech (2019).

Her book on "Applying Color Theory to Digital Media and Visualization" was published by CRC Press on November 17, 2016. In 2017, Theresa-Marie began exploring color harmony Harmony (color) with the Munsell color system and her work on "Visual Analytics with Complementary and Analogous Color Harmony" was published in the Munsell Color Blog. In 2018, she organized and contributed to the SIGGRAPH 2018 panel on "Color Mavens Advise on Digital Media Creation and Tools", that included representation from X-Rite/Pantone, Adobe, Rochester Institute of Technology and Pixar and was presented in Vancouver, Canada. In 2019, she combined "her Munsell Color Harmony work with Scientific Visualization efforts". As of 2020, she began writing on applying color to data visualizations for "Nightingale", the journal of the Data Visualization Society and UX Collective "UX Collective", an independent user experience (UX), visual, and product design publication under Medium. The second edition of her book was published in 2025 to include generative AI solutions for color suggestion.

In the 1990s, as a government contractor with Lockheed Martin Technical Services, she was the founding visualization leader of the US Environmental Protection Agency's Scientific Visualization Center. In the 2000s, she founded the Center for Visualization and Analytics and the Renaissance Computing Institute's Engagement Facility at North Carolina State University. Rhyne is the editor of the Visualization Viewpoints Department for IEEE Computer Graphics & Applications Magazine and serves on the Advisory Board of IEEE Computer magazine. She received a BS degree, two MS degrees, and the Degree of Engineer in Civil Engineering from Stanford University. She entered the computer graphics field as a result of her computational and geographic modeling research in geotechnical and earthquake engineering. She is also an internationally recognized digital media artist who began creating digital media with early Apple computers, including the colorization of early Macintosh educational software. She is a senior member of the IEEE Computer Society and of the Association for Computing Machinery (ACM).

She is also the founding director of the Association for Computing Machinery Special Interest Group on Graphics Cartographic Visualization Project (ACM SIGGRAPH Carto Project) that began in 1996. This effort holds a Birds-of-a-Feather session each year at the annual SIGGRAPH conference.
