= Juliana Freire =

Brazilian computer scientist

- Education: Stony Brook University
- Known for: Co-developer of VisTrails
- Spouse: Claudio Silva
- Awards: ACM Fellow
- Scientific career
- Fields: data management scientific visualization data science
- Workplaces: Bell Laboratories; Oregon Health & Science University; University of Utah; Scientific Computing and Imaging Institute; New York University
- Thesis: Scheduling Strategies for Evaluation of Recursive Queries over Memory and Disk-Resident Data (1997)
- Doctoral advisor: David S. Warren

Juliana Freire de Lima e Silva is a Brazilian computer scientist who works as a professor of computer science and engineering at the New York University. She is known for her research in information visualization, data provenance, and computerized assistance for scientific reproducibility.

== Education and career ==
Freire did her undergraduate studies at the Federal University of Ceará in Brazil, and earned her doctorate from Stony Brook University. Prior to joining NYU-Poly in 2011, she was a researcher at Bell Laboratories, and a faculty member at the Oregon Health & Science University and the University of Utah.

Freire was the program co-chair of the WWW2010 conference.

== Research ==
Freire's research projects include the VisTrails scientific workflow management system, and the DeepPeep search engine for web database content.

Along with Jennifer Jacquet, Gohar Petrossian, Sunandan Chakraborty, Freire initiated VIDA, designed for putting a stop to animal trafficking efforts by analyzing how illicit contraband is performed online.

== Recognition ==
In 2014, Freire was elected as a Fellow of the Association for Computing Machinery "for contributions to provenance management research and technology, and computational reproducibility." She was named to the 2021 class of Fellows of the American Association for the Advancement of Science.
