= Manish Parashar =

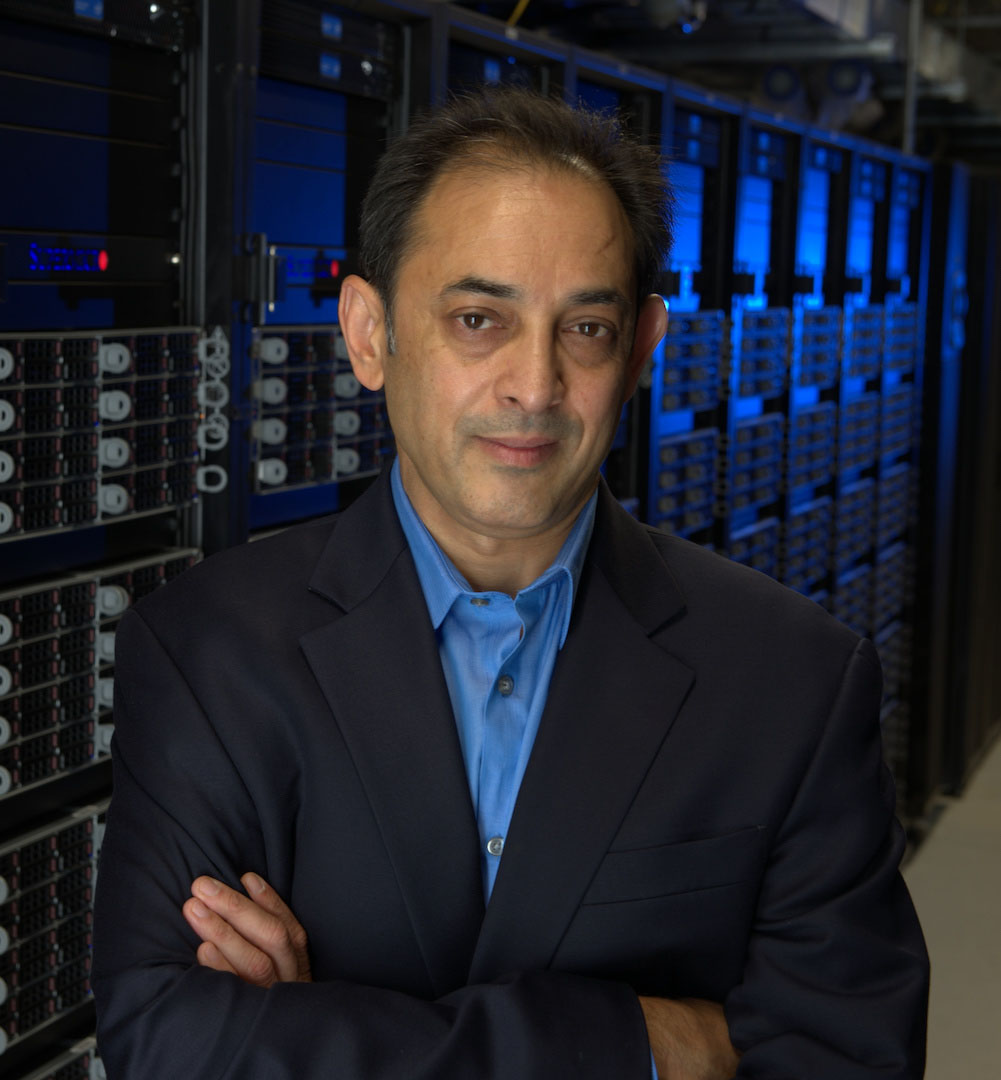
- Born: January 21, 1967 (age 59)
- Education: Syracuse University (MS and PhD); Bombay University (BE)
- Awards: IEEE Sidney Fernbach Award; CRA Distinguished Service Award; ACM Distinguished Service Award; AAAS Fellow; ACM Fellow; IEEE Fellow
- Scientific career
- Fields: Translational Computer Science; High Performance Parallel and Distributed Computing; National and Regional Cyberinfrastructure
- Workplaces: Scientific Computing and Imaging Institute at University of Utah; Office of Advanced Cyberinfrastructure, US National Science Foundation; Rutgers University
- Doctoral advisor: Salim Hariri
- Website: https://www.manishparashar.org

Manish Parashar (born 21 January 1967) is an Indian-American academic and computer scientist. He is a Presidential Professor at the Kahlert School of Computing and executive director and chair of computational science and engineering at the Scientific Computing and Imaging Institute at the University of Utah. He is also the inaugural Chief AI Officer for the University of Utah. He was the Founding Chair of the IEEE Technical Community on High Performance Computing (TCHPC). He is an AAAS Fellow, ACM Fellow, and IEEE Fellow. He also served as Office Director in the US National Science Foundation's Office of Advanced Cyberinfrastructure from 2018 to 2023.

Parashar currently leads the One-Utah Responsible Artificial Intelligence Initiative, which aims to realize a transdisciplinary ecosystem that fosters AI innovation to address scientific and societal grand challenges. He is the Faculty Co-Director of the Data Science & Ethics of Technology Initiative (DATASET) and One-Utah Data Science Hub at the University of Utah.

== Early life and education ==
Parashar received a BE degree in Electronics and Telecommunications from Bombay University, India, in 1988. Following this, he moved to the United States to pursue higher studies, earning his Master of Science and PhD degrees in 1994, both in Computer Engineering from Syracuse University. His Ph.D. thesis was titled Interpretive Performance Prediction for High Performance Parallel Computing. Before joining the University of Utah, he was a faculty member at Rutgers University.

== Career ==
Parashar began his career with postdoctoral work in computational science at The University of Texas at Austin (1994-1995). He then joined Rutgers University in 1997, holding several faculty positions, eventually becoming a Distinguished Professor. He also co-led the Office of Advanced Research Computing (OARC).

Parashar has also served as Program Director in the Office of Cyberinfrastructure (now Office of Advanced Cyberinfrastructure) at the US National Science Foundation between 2009 and 2011, where he focused on computational and data-enabled science and engineering research and education, software sustainability, cloud, and data intensive computing research programs, and managed an extensive research portfolio. He was responsible for establishing several new programs, including Software Infrastructure for Sustained Innovation (SI^{2}) and NSF Fellowships for Transformative Computational Science using Cyberinfrastructure (CI TraCS), and co-led the creation of the Computing in the Cloud (CIC) program.

As Assistant Director for Strategic Computing in the US Office of Science and Technology Policy(OSTP) in 2020, Parashar led the development of a national strategy for the Future Advanced Computing Ecosystem and formulated the National Strategic Computing Reserve in response to the COVID-19 pandemic.

In 2023, Parashar completed a five year IPA as Office Director for the Office of Advanced Cyberinfrastructure (OAC) at the National Science Foundation (NSF), where he oversaw NSF's investments in the exploration development, acquisition, and provisioning of state-of-the-art national cyberinfrastructure resources, tools, services, and expertise essential to the advancement and transformation of all of science and engineering.

In 2020, Parashar moved to the University of Utah, where he serves as the Director and Chair of Computational Science and Engineering at the Scientific Computing and Imaging Institute (SCI) and a Presidential Professor at the University of Utah's Kahlert School of Computing. He also leads the One-Utah Responsible Artificial Intelligence Initiative, a $100 Million University of Utah initiative aimed at harnessing translational AI to achieve societal good while protecting privacy, civil rights, and civil liberties and promoting fairness, accountability, transparency, and equity. He is a Faculty Co-Director of the Data Science & Ethics of Technology Initiative (DATASET), part of the One-Utah Data Science Hub, which is developing an overarching data-science strategy for the University of Utah.

== Awards and recognition ==
Manish Parashar has been honored with numerous prestigious awards highlighting his exceptional computing and cyberinfrastructure contributions. In 2024, he received the Computing Research Association (CRA) Distinguished Service Award for his impactful and multifaceted service to the computing research community. The award was preceded in 2023 by the IEEE Computer Society Sidney Fernbach Award, recognizing his groundbreaking work in distributed high-performance computing systems, data-driven workflows, and translational science. That same year, he was awarded the Achievement Award in High-Performance Distributed Computing at the ACM International Symposium on High-Performance Parallel and Distributed Computing for groundbreaking work in high performance parallel and distributed computational methods, data management, in-situ computing, and global leadership in cyberinfrastructure and translational computer science.

Parashar's innovative contributions were celebrated with the R&D 100 Award (2013) for his development of the "ADIOS: Adaptable I/O System for Big Data," a project that had a significant technological impact. The US National Science Foundation also recognized his academic achievements with the NSF CAREER Award (2000–2004), which acknowledged his early leadership and innovation in computational science.

Parashar has served the community in various leadership roles through his involvement with numerous technical committees. He was elevated to an IEEE Fellow in 2011, a Fellow with the American Association for the Advancement of Science(AAAS)in 2012, and a Fellow of the Association for Computing Machinery in 2020. He was awarded the IEEE T&C Distinguished Leadership Award in 2021. He is the Founding Chair of the Technical Consortium on High Performance Computing (TCHPC). He served as the Editor-in-Chief of the IEEE Transactions on Parallel and Distributed Systems (TPDS) from 2018 to 2022. He also earned election to IEEE Computer Society's Golden Core in 2016.

== Selected works ==
Manish Parashar has co-authored over 400 technical papers, including publications in leading journals and international conferences. Notable works include his contributions to structured adaptive mesh refinement (SAMR), extreme-scale data management, autonomic scientific computing, and national and regional cyberinfrastructure. His key papers include:

Structure Adaptive Mesh Refinement

- Parashar, M. and Browne, J.C. (2000) ‘Systems engineering for high performance computing software: The HDDA/dagh infrastructure for implementation of parallel structured adaptive mesh’, The IMA Volumes in Mathematics and its Applications, pp. 1–18. doi:10.1007/978-1-4612-1252-2_1.
- M. Parashar and J. C. Browne, "On partitioning dynamic adaptive grid hierarchies," Proceedings of HICSS-29: 29th Hawaii International Conference on System Sciences, Wailea, HI, USA, 1996, pp. 604–613 vol.1, doi: 10.1109/HICSS.1996.495511.
- J. Steensland, S. Chandra and M. Parashar, "An application-centric characterization of domain-based SFC partitioners for parallel SAMR," in IEEE Transactions on Parallel and Distributed Systems, vol. 13, no. 12, pp. 1275–1289, Dec. 2002, doi: 10.1109/TPDS.2002.1158265.

Extreme-scale Data Management

- C. Schmidt and M. Parashar, "Flexible information discovery in decentralized distributed systems," High Performance Distributed Computing, 2003. Proceedings. 12th IEEE International Symposium on, Seattle, WA, USA, 2003, pp. 226–235, doi: 10.1109/HPDC.2003.1210032.
- Docan, C., Parashar, M. and Klasky, S. (2011) ‘Dataspaces: An interaction and coordination framework for coupled simulation workflows’, Cluster Computing, 15(2), pp. 163–181. doi:10.1007/s10586-011-0162-y.

Autonomic Scientific Computing

- Parashar, M. and Hariri, S. (2005) ‘Autonomic computing: An overview’, Lecture Notes in Computer Science, pp. 257–269. doi:10.1007/11527800_20.
- Jin, T., Zhang, F., Sun, Q., Romanus, M., Bui, H. and Parashar, M. (2020) ‘Towards autonomic data management for staging-based coupled scientific workflows’, Journal of Parallel and Distributed Computing, 146, pp. 35–51. doi:10.1016/j.jpdc.2020.07.002
- Hua Liu, M. Parashar and S. Hariri, "A component-based programming model for autonomic applications," International Conference on Autonomic Computing, 2004. Proceedings., New York, NY, USA, 2004, pp. 10–17, doi: 1 0.1109/ICAC.2004.1301341.

National and regional cyberinfrastructure

- Rodero, I. and Parashar, M. (2019) ‘Data Cyber-Infrastructure for End-to-end Science: Experiences from the NSF Ocean Observatories Initiative’, Computing in Science & Engineering, pp. 1–1. doi:10.1109/MCSE.2019.2892769.
- M. Parashar, "Democratizing Science Through Advanced Cyberinfrastructure," in Computer, vol. 55, no. 9, pp. 79–84, Sept. 2022, doi: 10.1109/MC.2022.3174928.

Translational Computer Science

Parashar (along with David Abramson) pioneered the formalization of translational Computer Science (TCS) to complement traditional modes of computer science research and accelerate and amplify its impact. TCS refers to research that bridges foundational, use-inspired and applied research with delivering and deploying its outcomes to a target community. It supports essential bi-directional interplays where delivery and deployment processes inform the research.

- D. Abramson and M. Parashar, "Translational Research in Computer Science," in Computer, vol. 52, no. 9, pp. 16–23, Sept. 2019, doi: 10.1109/MC.2019.2925650.
