= Miriah Meyer =

American computer scientist

- Citizenship: American
- Education: Pennsylvania State University; University of Utah
- Awards: AAAS Mass Media Science & Engineering Fellowship (2006); MIT Technology Review TR35 (2011); Fast Company 100 Most Creative People (2012); TED Fellow (2013)
- Scientific career
- Fields: Computer science Data visualization
- Workplaces: Harvard University; Broad Institute; Scientific Computing and Imaging Institute; University of Utah; Linköping University
- Thesis: Dynamic particles for adaptive sampling of implicit surfaces (2008)
- Doctoral advisor: Ross T. Whitaker

Miriah Meyer is an American computer scientist and professor at Linköping University. She is noted for her pioneering work in data visualization for research applications. She received an American Association for the Advancement of Science Mass Media Science & Engineering Fellowship in 2006 and served as a reporter for The Chicago Tribune. She was named in MIT Technology Review's TR35 list in 2011 and Fast Company's list of the 100 most creative people in 2012. She was named a 2013 TED Fellow for her work in interactive visualization.

After completing her Ph.D., Meyer was a postdoctoral researcher at the Harvard University School of Engineering and Applied Sciences, working under the supervision of Hanspeter Pfister and Tamara Munzner. She joined the University of Utah in 2011 as an assistant professor in the School of Computing and the Scientific Computing and Imaging (SCI) Institute, was promoted to associate professor in 2017, and served as a visiting professor from 2018 to 2019. In 2021, she was appointed professor in the Department of Science and Technology at Linköping University.
