= Stephen Jacobsen =

American bioengineer

- Born: July 15, 1940; Salt Lake City, Utah, United States
- Died: April 3, 2016 (aged 75); Salt Lake City, Utah
- Education: University of Utah; MIT
- Known for: Founder of Sarcos
- Awards: Utah Governor's Medal for Science and Technology; Member of the National Academy of Engineering and National Academy of Medicine; ASME Leonardo Da Vinci Award; IEEE Robotics and Automation Society Pioneer Award
- Scientific career
- Fields: robotics bioengineering
- Workplaces: University of Utah
- Thesis: Control systems for artificial arms (1973)
- Doctoral advisor: Robert Mann

Stephen Charles Jacobsen (1940–2016) was an American bioengineer, a pioneer in his field, specifically in developing medical devices and tools, including an artificial kidney and an exoskeleton, and was Distinguished Professor at University of Utah. He was a Fellow of the National Academy of Engineering and Institute of Medicine.

Jacobsen founded Sarcos, a technological company producing robots and microelectromechanical systems, in 1983.
