= CTIA =

CTIA may refer to:

- Color Television Interface Adaptor, a custom chip inside early Atari 8-bit computers
- CTIA (organization), a trade association representing the wireless communications industry in the United States
- Cape Town International Airport, the main airport serving the city of Cape Town, South Africa
- Chengdu Tianfu International Airport, a major commercial airport in Chengdu, Sichuan, China
