= Chandrika Kamath =

Computer scientist

Chandrika Kamath is a computer scientist and data scientist whose research involves information extraction from scientific data, including methods of digital image processing, video processing, dimension reduction, and feature extraction. Educated in India and the US, she works as a researcher at the Center for Applied Scientific Computing at the Lawrence Livermore National Laboratory.

== Education and career ==
Kamath is a 1981 graduate of IIT Bombay, where she earned a bachelor's degree in electrical engineering. She studied computer science at the University of Illinois Urbana-Champaign, earned a master's degree there in 1984, and completed her Ph.D. in 1986.

After working in the computer industry, including software engineering for the Digital Equipment Corporation, she joined the Lawrence Livermore National Laboratory in 1997. There, her research interests shifted from parallel algorithms for numerical computing to her current focus on scientific data mining. At LLNL, she is the team leader for Sapphire, a software tool for scientific data exploration.

Kamath was one of the three founding co-editors-in-chief of the journal Statistical Analysis and Data Mining, first published in 2008.

== Book ==
Kamath is the author of Scientific Data Mining: A Practical Perspective (Society for Industrial and Applied Mathematics, 2009).

== Recognition ==
Kamath was named as a Fellow of the Society for Industrial and Applied Mathematics (SIAM) in 2023, "for community leadership and contributions to data mining and its application to real-world problems in science and engineering".
