= Joseph D. Andrade =

American academic

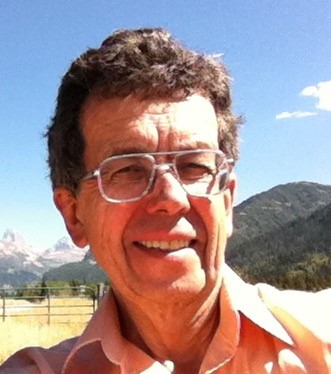
- Born: July 13, 1941 (age 85); Hayward, California
- Occupations: Professor, educator, scientist, writer
- Known for: Minimum Interfacial Free Energy Hypothesis for Biocompatibility

Academic background
- Education: B.Sc., Materials Science; Ph.D., Metallurgy and Materials Science
- Alma mater: San Jose State University; University of Denver

Academic work
- Sub-discipline: Surface chemistry, bioengineering
- Website: www.joeandrade.org

Joseph D. Andrade is an American bioengineer, professor, educator, scientist and writer. He is distinguished professor emeritus in the Departments of Bioengineering, Materials Science and Engineering, and Pharmaceutics at University of Utah.

Andrade's research has been focused on biomaterials and on biochemical sensors. He has supervised some 50 graduate students, written seven books, produced 125 scientific papers and holds six patents.

Andrade became a Fellow of the American Institute for Medical and Biological Engineering in 1991 and was awarded an honorary doctorate from Uppsala University in 2000.

== Education ==
Andrade entered the University of California-Berkeley in Fall, 1959, where he studied for more than two years and then dropped out. Two years later he was awarded the B.S. in Materials Science from San Jose State University, in 1965. He then attended the University of Denver, completing his Ph.D. in Metallurgy and Materials Science in January, 1969.

== Career ==
Andrade joined the University of Utah as an assistant professor in 1969. He rose through the ranks to become a distinguished professor in 2001. In 1983, he was appointed dean of College of Engineering and served until 1987. He served as chairman of the Department of Bioengineering from 1988 to 1991, interim chair of the Department of Pharmaceutics from 1998 to 1999 and the co-chair of the Department of Bioengineering from 1998 to 2000.

From 1977 to 1979, Andrade was the editor-in-chief of the Journal of Bioengineering. He served as the Vice President for Public Policy at the American Institute of Medical and Biological Engineering from 1992 to 1994 and was the program chair of the 1993 meeting, which resulted in the book, Medical and Biological Engineering in the Future of Health Care.

Andrade's public service and community activities include enhancing elementary school science education and informal science education. He developed the University of Utah's first video-intensive general science telecourse, Science without Walls: Science in Your World, which was broadcast throughout most of Utah on KUEN for some 20 years, ending in 2012. He contributed significantly to the genesis and establishment of The Leonardo - Salt Lake City's Science, Art, Technology Center, which opened in 2011. He served as science advisor and on the board of directors for several additional years. The Leonardo closed in October, 2025 and no longer exists. Its history is summarized in a chapter of his 2023 Memoir.

In 2012, Andrade retired as emeritus and distinguished professor, University of Utah. The same year, he ran as an unaffiliated candidate for Congress in Utah's District 2 on a Towards a Sustainable Future campaign.

== Research and work ==
Andrade's research has been focused on biomaterials and on biochemical sensors. He is most known for formulating the minimum interfacial free energy hypothesis for biocompatibility. His early work dealt with blood-materials interactions and with approaches for enhanced blood compatibility, based largely on protein-coated, hydrogel-coated, and/or polyethylene glycol-coated surfaces.

His PhD dissertation was a theoretical model of protein adsorption. Later, the theory work was expanded to include polyethylene-glycol and similar interfaces. The focus on surfaces and interfaces required analysis of and development of tools for the characterization of polymer-based interfaces, including interface electric potentials, interfacial energy, chemical composition (via X-ray Photoelectron Spectroscopy), and interface fluorescence analysis.

The second stage of his research career focused on biochemical sensors, based initially on fiber optics and total internal reflection fluorescence (TIRF) analysis. The biochemical sensor work used firefly luciferase bioluminescence and enzyme biochemistry for substrate specificity.

He developed the University of Utah's first video-intensive general science telecourse – Science without Walls: Science in Your World – beginning in 1989. The 40 segment TV course was broadcast on KUEN TV throughout Utah for 20 years, until 2012.

In 2005 he began working to make clear and obvious the underlying assumptions that form the basis of the current economic system. This was the basis of his 2012 run for US Congress in Utah's Second Congressional District. He lost. He is now focused on planetary sustainability for the 21st century. He uses online resources to distribute ideas, memes and semi-fictional writings. In April 2016, he published State Change: A Chemical Fantasy, a semi-novel in which 29 real right wing ideologues are given MDMA illegally and secretly in order to improve their objectivity, rationality, and empathy.

== Awards and honors ==
- 1978 - Ebert Prize, Academy of Pharmaceutical Sciences
- 1981 - Distinguished Research Award, University of Utah
- 1985 - Clemson Award for Contributions to Literature, Biomaterials Society and Clemson University
- 1987 - Patent Prize, College of Engineering, University of Utah
- 1991 - Polymer Science Pioneers, Polymer News
- 1991 - Fellow, American Institute of Medical and Biological Engineering
- 1992 - Utah Governor's Medal for Science and Technology
- 1992 - Distinguished University Service Award in Biological Sciences, Utah Academy of Sciences, Arts, and Letters
- 1993 - Faculty Service Award, College of Engineering, University of Utah
- 1995 - Honorary Member, Materials Research Society of India
- 1995 - Surface in Biomaterials Fdn Award for Excellence in Surface Science
- 2000 - Honorary PhD Degree, Uppsala University, Sweden
- 2011 - Prolific Inventor, University of Utah

== Publications ==
=== Books ===
- Obrigado Pela Vida – Thank You For Life – A Memoir (2023)
- State Change: A Chemical Fantasy (2016)
- Science without Walls: Science in YOUR World (1998)
- Medical and Biological Engineering in the Future of Health Care (1994)
- Dynamic Aspects of Polymer Surfaces (1988)
- Artificial Organs: The W J Kolff Festschrift (1987)
- Surface and Interfacial Aspects of Biomedical Polymers Vol. 1 – Surface Chemistry and Physics (1985)
- Surface and Interfacial Aspects of Biomedical Polymers Vol. 2 – Protein Adsorption (1985)
- Hydrogels for Medical and Related Applications (1976)
