= Penny Rheingans =

American computer scientist

Penny L. Rheingans
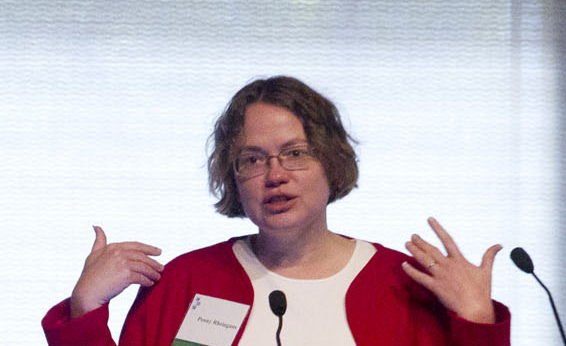
- Rheingans in 2011
- Education: Harvard University (BA, 1985); University of North Carolina at Chapel Hill (PhD, 1993)
- Awards: IEEE Visualization Academy (2020)
- Scientific career
- Fields: Information visualization; Non-photorealistic rendering; Volume rendering
- Workplaces: University of Mississippi; University of Maryland, Baltimore County; University of Maine
- Thesis: Dynamic Explorations of Multiple Variables in a 2D Space (1993)
- Doctoral advisor: Fred Brooks

Penny L. Rheingans is an American computer scientist specializing in information visualization, including methods for non-photorealistic rendering of volumetric data and for visualizing uncertainty in data. She is a professor of computer science at the University of Maine, where she directs the School of Computing and Information Science.

== Education and career ==
Rheingans majored in computer science at Harvard University, graduating cum laude in 1985. She went to the University of North Carolina at Chapel Hill for graduate study, completing her Ph.D. in computer science there in 1993. Her dissertation, Dynamic Explorations of Multiple Variables in a 2D Space, was supervised by Fred Brooks.

She became an assistant professor at the University of Mississippi in 1995, and moved to the University of Maryland, Baltimore County in 1998. She earned tenure as an associate professor there in 2003, and was promoted to full professor in 2009. Beginning in 2009, she also directed the university's Center for Women in Technology. In 2018 she moved to the University of Maine as director of the School of Computing and Information Science.

== Recognition ==
In 2020, Rheingans was listed in the IEEE Visualization Academy by the IEEE Visualization and Graphics Technical Community.
