= University of Utah School of Computing =

School in University of Utah

The Kahlert School of Computing is a school within the College of Engineering at the University of Utah in Salt Lake City, Utah.

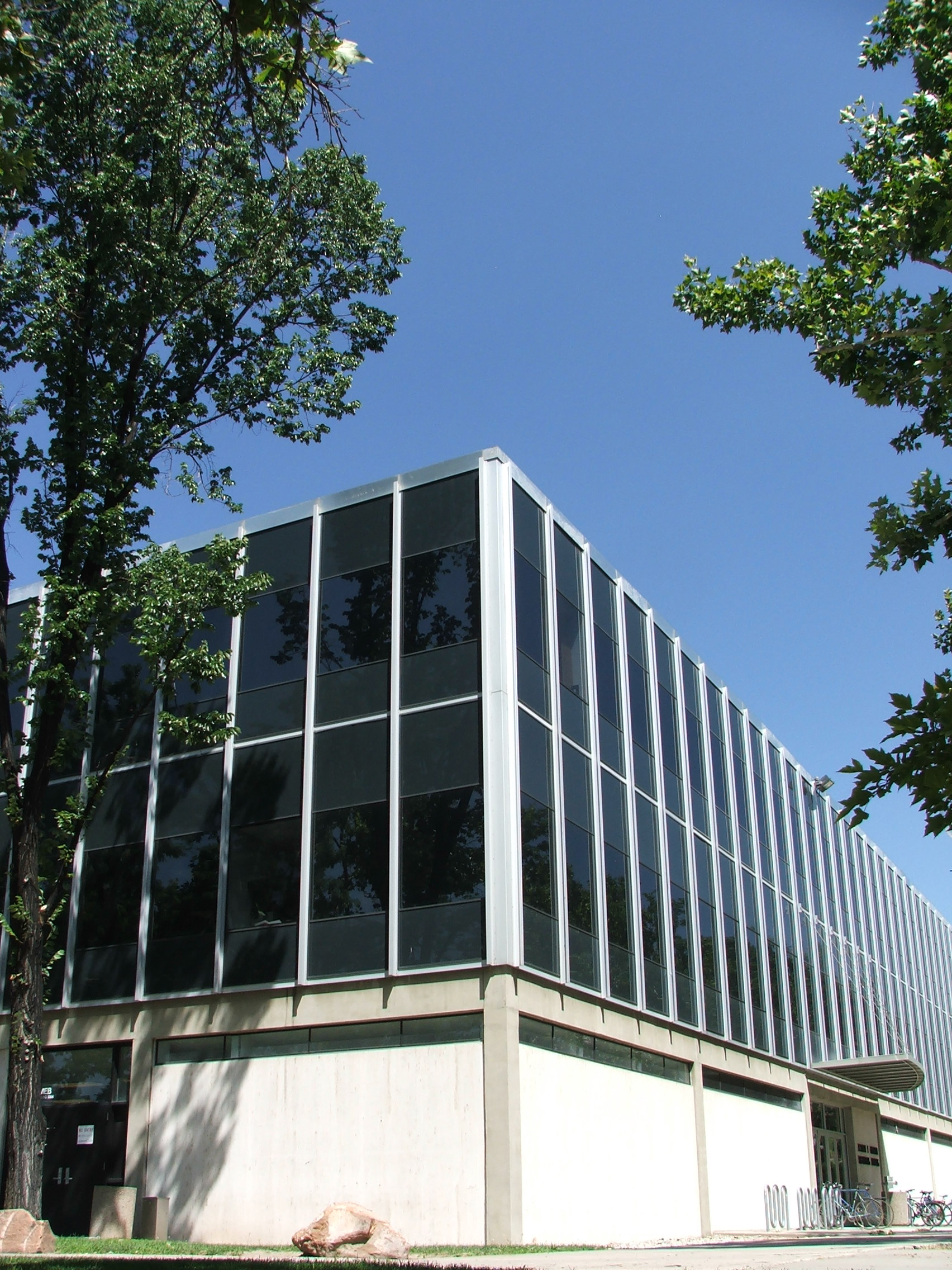
Merrill Engineering Building, University of Utah

== School of Computing ==
The school offers undergraduate and graduate degrees in computer science. The school has major research funding that supports initiatives in:

- Animation
- Computer architecture and VLSI
- Computer graphics
- Computer security and information privacy
- Computer information systems
- Human-computer interaction
- Image analysis
- Natural language processing
- Networks, embedded systems, and operating systems
- Program analysis
- Robotics
- Data management and analysis
- Scientific visualization and data visualization

The School of Computing has made important contributions to computer graphics and computer animation. These contributions include:

- Gouraud shading
- Phong reflection model
- Phong shading
- rendering equation
- Utah teapot

== History ==
Computing research at the University of Utah started in 1965 when former university president James Fletcher recruited Berkeley professor David C. Evans to return to his home state to establish a computer science division within the electrical engineering department. Evans graduated from the University of Utah in 1953 with a Ph.D. in physics. Before returning to Utah, Evans developed computing systems, first at Bendix as project manager of the commercially successful G-15 computer and follow-on G-20 (1955-1962). While at Berkeley from 1962-1965, Evans and G-15 architect Harry Huskey initiated Project Genie, which led to innovations such as the Scientific Data Systems 940 time-sharing operating system.

Upon his return to the University of Utah, Evans wanted to cultivate a culture of creativity. He hired faculty with diverse experiences and backgrounds and encouraged interactive use of computing for a variety of creative pursuits.

Evans was immediately awarded a large ARPA grant from Robert William Taylor, then director of the ARPA IPTO office, to create a center of excellence in computer graphics. Evans believed that small, interactive computers should be developed to augment human creativity, and he planned to use the ARPA award to pursue this line of research. Leveraging the multimillion-dollar funding from ARPA, Evans was able to harness the absolute state-of-the-art in equipment needed to advance this area.

The University of Utah was one of the original four nodes of ARPANET, the world's first packet-switched network and embryo of the current worldwide Internet. In late 1969, the U's computer graphics department was linked into the node at Stanford Research Institute in Menlo Park, California to complete the initial four-node network.

This computer science division at Utah became its own department in 1973.

=== ARPANET ===
Efforts in networking and storage at the University of Utah were spurred by Evans' role in establishing a new computer science division in 1965. Bolstered by a large contract from ARPA, each of the four original nodes interfaced with different computers to explore interoperability issues: a PDP-10 (University of Utah), an SDS Sigma 7 (University of California, Los Angeles), an SDS 940 (Stanford Research Institute) and an IBM 360 (University of California, Santa Barbara).

Evans and graduate student Steve Carr came from Berkeley to lead early efforts in ARPANET research at University of Utah. Carr participated in the first Network Working Group meeting in 1968, chaired by Elmer Shapiro from SRI, and also attended by Steve Crocker, Jeff Rulifson, and Ron Stoughton. With UCLA researchers, Carr designed the initial Host-to-Host Communication Protocol for the Arpanet(1970).

Taylor was credited with initiating the ARPANET project as director of ARPA's Information Processing Techniques Office (1966-1969). The architecture of the ARPANET and the use of a separate Interface Message Processor (IMP) was hatched in 1967 by Wesley A. Clark of Washington University while in a rental car with Taylor and Evans. Taylor worked with Evans at University of Utah in 1970, before heading to California to launch legendary computer science laboratory Xerox Palo Alto Research Center, which later employed several Utah graduates, including Alan Kay, John Warnock, Martin Newell, Patrick Baudelaire, and Frank Crow.

Taylor and Larry Roberts prepared and signed the networking program plan for ARPA funding in 1968. An RFP for procurement of 4 IMPs was released after the program plan was approved by the Director of ARPA. Larry Roberts and Barry Wessler (and other contractors) reviewed the proposals and selected BBN Technologies as the winner. Barry Wessler remained at ARPA managing the IMP implementation and first installations at UCLA, SRI, UCSB and Utah. In 1970 Barry Wessler left ARPA and became a Utah graduate student under Evans until he received his Ph.D. in 1973.

=== Computer Graphics at Utah ===
During the era of Evans and Sutherland, graduates of the Utah program made seminal contributions to rendering, shading, animation, visualization and virtual reality (notably the work of John Warnock in 1969, Henri Gouraud in 1971, Donald Vickers in 1972, Phong in 1973, Ed Catmull and Fred Parke in 1974, Henry Fuchs and Martin Newell in 1975, Frank Crow in 1976, Jim Blinn in 1978, Jim Kajiya in 1979, and many others). Additional graphics faculty hired during this time included computer artist Ron Resch (1970-1979) and Rich Riesenfeld, an expert in computer-aided geometric design (1972–present).

=== Early Graphics and Visualization Images ===
In 1968, the equipment needed to produce an image representation was significant: a mainframe Univac performed the computations to produce the image, it sent its result to a PDP-8, which through analog output lines sent the image to a Tektronix oscilloscope to draw lines. A camera then recorded the image, without the image ever being displayed on a screen. Color images required several photos, each with a different colored filter. John Warnock, who received his Ph.D. in 1969, developed the first scientific visualizations using this approach. After Utah, Warnock moved to Evans and Sutherland, Xerox PARC, and then co-founded Adobe in 1982.

=== Utah Teapot ===
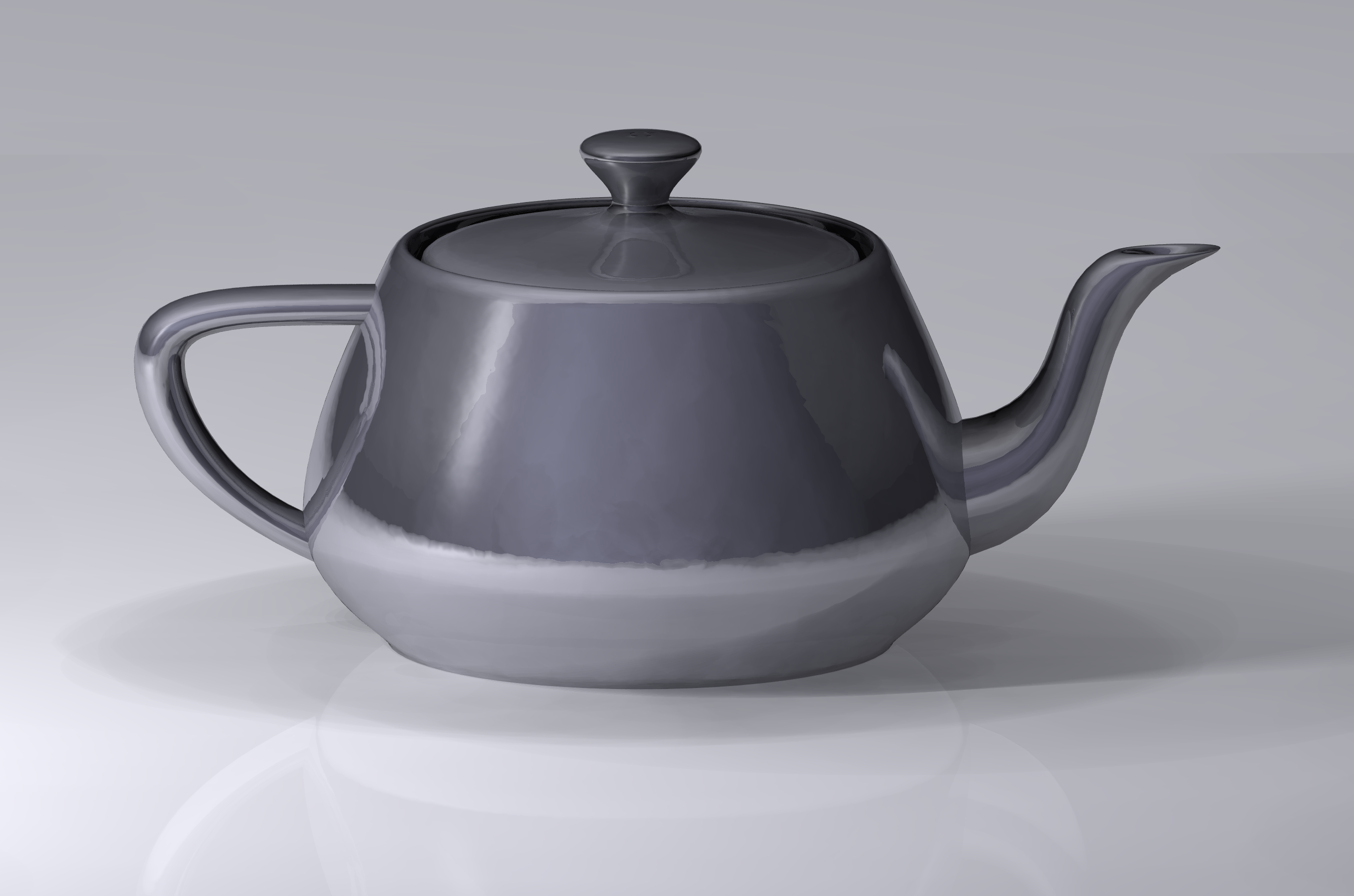
The Utah teapot, a model by Martin Newell (1975).

The Utah Teapot is one of the most iconic image in computer graphics. It was designed by Martin Newell, inspired by an actual Melitta teapot he purchased from a department store in Salt Lake City. Newell was a student of Evans, graduating in 1975, and then a member of the faculty from 1975 to 1977. Originally the teapot was sketched by hand using paper and pencil. Newell then edited Bézier control points on a Tektronix storage tube. With this information he created a dataset of mathematical coordinates and a 3-D wire framing. The Utah Teapot was one of the first widely available and photogenic curved-surface 3-D models, an early high-quality virtual object. For this reason, it became a common benchmark model for image synthesis programs.

=== Other Modeling Efforts ===
Utah students modeled other common objects. For his 1971 dissertation, Henri Gouraud developed Gouraud shading, using his wife Sylvie's face as a model. In 1972, Ivan Sutherland challenged his graphics class to choose something iconic to realistically render. The students selected the Volkswagen Beetle—as a symbol of global culture, because it was large enough to measure as a group, and because Ivan’s wife, Marsha, owned one. The students painted points and lines on the surface of the Beetle to describe a set of polygons. A volleyball stanchion and joints in the pavement formed a three-dimensional reference system. The points and polygons were rendered using hardware developed by 1970 Utah Ph.D. Gary Watkins to imprint shaded images onto a direct film recorder. Also in 1972, Ed Catmull and Fred Parke, both students of Sutherland, made a video illustrating the process of modeling Catmull's left hand and its use in animation. Catmull made a plaster mold, to which he then added points and polygons in a similar way. Catmull received his Ph.D. in 1974, and went on to found Pixar. The video has recently been added to the National Film register as one of the earliest fully rendered computer animations.

=== Graphics and Visualization Center ===
In 1991, Brown University, Caltech, Cornell University, University of Utah and University of North Carolina partnered to form the Graphics and Visualization Center, an NSF Science and Technology Center. The focus of the center was to conduct graphics research in modeling, rendering, user interfaces and high-performance architectures. The research was driven by two application areas: scientific visualization and telecollaboration in virtual environments. Utah's involvement, led by Rich Riesenfeld (faculty from 1972 to 2015) and Elaine Cohen (faculty since 1984), included the mathematics of surfaces, modeling, human-computer interfaces, and design. The research built on Riesenfeld and Cohen's prior work on B-splines, NURBs and the Oslo-algorithm for geometric and shaded rendering computations.

=== Programming Languages and Personal Computers ===
Alan Kay, a student of Evans, developed object-oriented programming technology, a foundation of current programming systems. At Utah, Kay learned to think of computers as dynamic, interactive personal devices to support creative thought - the founding principle of his work. Kay's Ph.D. thesis (1969) described the design of the FLEX machine, a flexible, extensible programming language developed in collaboration with Ed Cheadle. Kay dreamed of a device called the Dynabook, a portable electronic device the size of a three-ring notebook with a touch-sensitive liquid crystal screen and a keyboard - precursor to the Apple iPad.

Along with other Utah graduates, Kay's early career was spent as a founding computer science researcher at Xerox PARC. At PARC, Kay was involved in the design of Alto, often called the first personal computer. More significantly, Kay invented Smalltalk, the first object-oriented programming language, for which he received the prestigious Turing Award in 2003. After leaving Xerox, Kay held research positions at Atari, Apple Inc., Hewlett-Packard and Disney before starting Viewpoints Research Institute, a nonprofit organization dedicated to supporting educational media for children.

In January 1992, students Michael Moore and Richard Nash developed the first internet chess server and hosted it at lark.utah.edu for people to access through telnet. The server moved in July to Carnegie Mellon University and Daniel Sleator later took over management.

== Recent history ==
The School of Computing is also home to the Entertainment Arts and Entertainment (EAE) Program, which is the result of interdisciplinary collaboration between the College of Engineering at the University of Utah and the University of Utah College of Fine Arts. In 2014, the EAE Program was ranked second for its undergraduate program and fourth for its graduate program by the Princeton Review.

The School of Computing is also affiliated with the Scientific Computing and Imaging Institute, which focuses on research in scientific visualization, scientific computing, and medical image analysis. The institute currently has over 200 faculty and staff, most of which are from the School of Computing or Bioengineering departments.

== Notable people ==
Given its long history and affiliation with the development of computer science as a field, the School has been home to a number of respected scientists, entrepreneurs, and educators.

=== Notable alumni ===
- Robert Adamson (software pioneer) - Computer scientist. Developed Gener/OL, one of the first interpretive languages.
- Alan Ashton - Computer scientist, co-founder of WordPerfect and Thanksgiving Point
- Brian A. Barsky - Professor at the University of California, Berkeley working in computer graphics and geometric modeling as well as in optometry and vision science.
- Jim Blinn - Computer scientist and MacArthur Fellow, known for his work on Carl Sagan's Cosmos documentary and inventing the first method for representing surface textures in graphical images.
- Edwin Catmull - An Academy Award winning computer scientist, recipient of the 2019 ACM Turing Award, who is the co-founder of Pixar Animation Studios and was the President of Walt Disney Animation Studios.
- Jim Clark - Computer scientist, prolific entrepreneur and founder of several technology companies, including Silicon Graphics, Inc., Netscape Communications Corporation, myCFO and Healtheon
- Michael F. Cohen - Senior Research Scientist at Microsoft Research, now at Facebook Research, recognized for work on radiosity methods for image synthesis
- Frank Crow - Computer scientist, developed anti-aliasing methods for computer graphics
- Alyosha Efros - computer vision researcher and winner of the ACM Prize in Computing
- Justin Frankel - developed Winamp, invented the gnutella peer-to-peer network, and founded Cockos Incorporated (best known for the REAPER digital audio workstation)
- Henry Fuchs - Computer scientist, research in high-performance graphics hardware; 3D medical imaging; head-mounted display and virtual environments.
- Amy Gooch - Computer scientist, inventor of the Gooch shading model
- Henri Gouraud, Computer scientist, inventor of Gouraud shading
- Jim Kajiya - Computer scientist, developed the frame buffer concept for storing and displaying single-raster images and the rendering equation.
- Alan Kay - Computer scientist, recipient of the 2003 ACM Turing Award, credited with the concept of the Laptop computer.[17]
- Gordon Kindlmann - Computer scientist, invented the tensor glyph
- Miriah Meyer - computer scientist, pioneer in interactive visualization for basic research
- Martin Newell - Computer scientist and graphics pioneer best known as the creator of the Utah Teapot
- Fred Parke - creator of the first CG physically modeled human face
- Bui Tuong Phong, Computer scientist, inventor of the Phong reflection model and the Phong shading model
- John Warnock, Computer scientist, founder of Adobe Systems, which developed the Postscript language for desktop publishing.
- Telle Whitney, CEO and President of the Anita Borg Institute for Women and Technology.

=== Notable faculty ===
- David C. Evans - founder of the computer science department at the university; graphics pioneer and co-founder of Evans & Sutherland
- Matthew Flatt - member of the Racket programming language core development team
- Alexandra Illmer Forsythe - author of the first computer science textbook
- Anthony C. Hearn – developed the REDUCE computer algebra system, co-founder of CSNET computer network
- John M. Hollerbach - editor of the International Journal of Robotics Research, co-founder of the International Symposium on Robotics Research, and co-inventor of the Utah/MIT dexterous hand
- Christopher R. Johnson - founding director of the Scientific Computing and Imaging Institute, recipient of the IEEE Computer Society Sidney Fernbach Award, and recipient of the Utah Governor's Medal for Science and Technology
- Elliott Organick - educator considered "the foremost expositor writer of computer science"
- John Regehr - developed the C compiler fuzzer Csmith, the Clang C compiler integer overflow sanitizer, and widely-read blog Embedded in Academia
- Ivan Sutherland - winner of the Turing Award in 1988 for Sketchpad; co-founder of Evans and Sutherland
- Suresh Venkatasubramanian - developed the notion of t-closeness in differential privacy and the widely-read Geomblog
- Joseph Zachary - educator and charter member of the United States Department of Energy Undergraduate Computational Engineering and Science (UCES) Project
