= Vapor (disambiguation) =

A vapor is a substance in the gas phase below its critical temperature.

Vapor, vapors, vapour or vapours may also refer to:

== Art, entertainment, and media ==
=== Film ===
- Vapor (film), a Canadian comedy-drama short film
- Vapors (film), a 1965 short film

=== Music ===
- "Vapor" (song), a 2015 song by 5 Seconds of Summer
- Vapours (album), a 2009 album by Islands
- The Vapors, an English new-wave/power pop band
- "Vapours", a single by Nathaniel Willemse
- "The Vapours", a song on rock concept album The Philosophy of Velocity by Brazil
- "Vapors", a song by Biz Markie

=== Other art, entertainment, and media ===
- Vapor (G.I. Joe), a fictional villain in the G.I. Joe universe, member of Cobra
- Vapor (Marvel Comics), a villainess
- Vapor (novel), by Amanda Filipacchi
- "Vapors" (seaQuest DSV), a second-season episode of seaQuest DSV

== Other uses ==
- VAPOR (software), a visualization tool used in geosciences
- Vapor (web framework), an open-source web framework written in Swift
- Vapour Col, South Shetland Islands, Antarctica
- Vapours (mental condition), an archaic term for certain mental and/or physical illnesses
- Composition of electronic cigarette aerosol

== See also ==
- Vaper, a user of electronic cigarettes
- Vapor Trail (disambiguation)
- Vaporware, a term in the computer industry
- Vaporwave, a musical genre and aesthetic
