= Texture advection =

Family of methods in scientific visualization

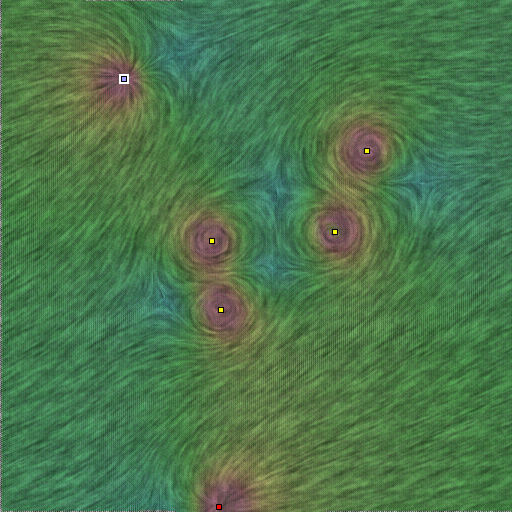
Line integral convolution visualisation of a flow field.

In scientific visualization, texture advection is a family of methods to densely visualize vector fields or flows (like the wind movement of a tornado). Scientists can use the created images and animations to better understand these flows and reason about them. In comparison to techniques that visualise streamlines, streaklines, or timelines, methods of this family don't need any seed points and can produce a whole image at every step.

The methods have in common that they bend a whole image (or texture) according to the flow to create a new image that is warped by the flow. If that is done in small enough time steps and often enough, the images can be combined to create an animation visualising the flow.

== Methods ==
- Image-based flow visualization
- Lagrangian–Eulerian advection
- Line integral convolution
