= Field line =

Visual aid to depiction of a vector field

Field lines depicting the electric field created by a positive charge (left), negative charge (center), and uncharged object (right).

A field line is a graphical visual aid for visualizing vector fields. It consists of an imaginary integral curve which is tangent to the field vector at each point along its length. A diagram showing a representative set of neighboring field lines is a common way of depicting a vector field in scientific and mathematical literature; this is called a field line diagram. They are used to show electric fields, magnetic fields, and gravitational fields among many other types. In fluid mechanics, field lines showing the velocity field of a fluid flow are called streamlines.

== Definition and description ==
The figure at left shows the electric field lines of two isolated equal positive charges. The figure at right shows the electric field lines of two isolated equal charges of opposite sign.

A vector field defines a direction and magnitude at each point in space. A field line is an integral curve for that vector field and may be constructed by starting at a point and tracing a line through space that follows the direction of the vector field, by making the field line tangent to the field vector at each point. A field line is usually shown as a directed line segment, with an arrowhead indicating the direction of the vector field. For two-dimensional fields the field lines are plane curves; since a plane drawing of a 3-dimensional set of field lines can be visually confusing most field line diagrams are of this type. Since at each point where it is nonzero and finite the vector field has a unique direction, field lines can never intersect, so there is exactly one field line passing through each point at which the vector field is nonzero and finite. Points where the field is zero or infinite have no field line through them, since direction cannot be defined there, but can be the endpoints of field lines.

Since there are an infinite number of points in any region, an infinite number of field lines can be drawn; but only a limited number can be shown on a field line diagram. Therefore, which field lines are shown is a choice made by the person or computer program which draws the diagram, and a single vector field may be depicted by different sets of field lines. A field line diagram is necessarily an incomplete description of a vector field, since it gives no information about the field between the drawn field lines, and the choice of how many and which lines to show determines how much useful information the diagram gives.

An individual field line shows the direction of the vector field but not the magnitude. In order to also depict the magnitude of the field, field line diagrams are often drawn so that each line represents the same quantity of flux. Then the density of field lines (number of field lines per unit perpendicular area) at any location is proportional to the magnitude of the vector field at that point. Areas in which neighboring field lines are converging (getting closer together) indicates that the field is getting stronger in that direction.

In vector fields which have nonzero divergence, field lines begin on points of positive divergence (sources) and end on points of negative divergence (sinks), or extend to infinity. For example, electric field lines begin on positive electric charges and end on negative charges. In fields which are divergenceless (solenoidal), such as magnetic fields, field lines have no endpoints; they are either closed loops or are endless.

In physics, drawings of field lines are mainly useful in cases where the sources and sinks, if any, have a physical meaning, as opposed to e.g. the case of a force field of a radial harmonic. For example, Gauss's law states that an electric field has sources at positive charges, sinks at negative charges, and neither elsewhere, so electric field lines start at positive charges and end at negative charges. A gravitational field has no sources, it has sinks at masses, and it has neither elsewhere, gravitational field lines come from infinity and end at masses. A magnetic field has no sources or sinks (Gauss's law for magnetism), so its field lines have no start or end: they can only form closed loops, extend to infinity in both directions, or continue indefinitely without ever crossing itself. However, as stated above, a special situation may occur around points where the field is zero (that cannot be intersected by field lines, because their direction would not be defined) and the simultaneous begin and end of field lines takes place. This situation happens, for instance, in the middle between two identical positive electric point charges. There, the field vanishes and the lines coming axially from the charges end. At the same time, in the transverse plane passing through the middle point, an infinite number of field lines diverge radially. The concomitant presence of the lines that end and begin preserves the divergence-free character of the field in the point.

Note that for this kind of drawing, where the field-line density is intended to be proportional to the field magnitude, it is important to represent all three dimensions. For example, consider the electric field arising from a single, isolated point charge. The electric field lines in this case are straight lines that emanate from the charge uniformly in all directions in three-dimensional space. This means that their density is proportional to $1/r^2$, the correct result consistent with Coulomb's law for this case. However, if the electric field lines for this setup were just drawn on a two-dimensional plane, their two-dimensional density would be proportional to $1/r$, an incorrect result for this situation.

== Construction ==
Construction of a field line

Given a vector field $\mathbf{F}(\mathbf{x})$ and a starting point $\mathbf{x}_\text{0}$ a field line can be constructed iteratively by finding the field vector at that point $\mathbf{F}(\mathbf{x}_\text{0})$. The unit tangent vector at that point is: $\mathbf{F}(\mathbf{x}_\text{0})/|\mathbf{F}(\mathbf{x}_\text{0})|$. By moving a short distance $ds$ along the field direction a new point on the line can be found
$$\mathbf{x}_\text{1} = \mathbf{x}_\text{0} + {\mathbf{F}(\mathbf{x}_\text{0}) \over |\mathbf{F}(\mathbf{x}_\text{0})|}ds$$
Then the field at that point $\mathbf{F}(\mathbf{x}_\text{1})$ is found and moving a further distance $ds$ in that direction the next point $\mathbf{F}(\mathbf{x}_\text{2})$ of the field line is found. At each point $\mathbf{x}_\text{i}$ the next point can be found by
$$\mathbf{x}_\text{i+1} = \mathbf{x}_\text{i} + {\mathbf{F}(\mathbf{x}_\text{i}) \over |\mathbf{F}(\mathbf{x}_\text{i})|}ds$$
By repeating this and connecting the points, the field line can be extended as far as desired. This is only an approximation to the actual field line, since each straight segment isn't actually tangent to the field along its length, just at its starting point. But by using a small enough value for $ds$, taking a greater number of shorter steps, the field line can be approximated as closely as desired. The field line can be extended in the opposite direction from $\mathbf{x}_\text{0}$ by taking each step in the opposite direction by using a negative step $-ds$.

== Examples ==
Different ways to depict the field of a magnet.

If the vector field describes a velocity field, then the field lines follow stream lines in the flow. Perhaps the most familiar example of a vector field described by field lines is the magnetic field, which is often depicted using field lines emanating from a magnet.

=== Electric field lines ===
The electric field (lines with arrows) of a charge (+) induces surface charges (red and blue areas) on metal objects due to electrostatic induction.

A convenient way to plot the electric field that works even for complex electric fields is to use field lines. Here the magnitude and direction of an electric field in a region is represented by a number of non-intersecting curved lines that span the region. If plotted correctly, the direction of the electric field at any given point is represented by the direction of nearby lines while the magnitude is represented by the density of the field lines in that region.

Electric field lines do not intersect. They begin at positive charge (or extend from infinity) and end at negative charge (or extend to infinity). Further the number of field lines from a given charge must be proportional to that charge. Electrostatic fields cannot form closed loops. (See the figure for an example of a complex electric field line diagram made for a positive point charge which induces electrical charge on the surfaces of 3 nearby conductors.

Field lines can only approximately represent the electric field in a given region. (It takes an infinite number of field lines to represent the electric field perfectly.) Nevertheless, these diagrams are useful at illustrating how the electric field changes over a given region, and thereby an idea about the charge configuration in space. For example, in vacuum, electric field lines will be straight if and only if the charge configuration possesses spherical, cylindrical, or planar symmetry.

=== Magnetic field lines ===
Visualizing magnetic fields
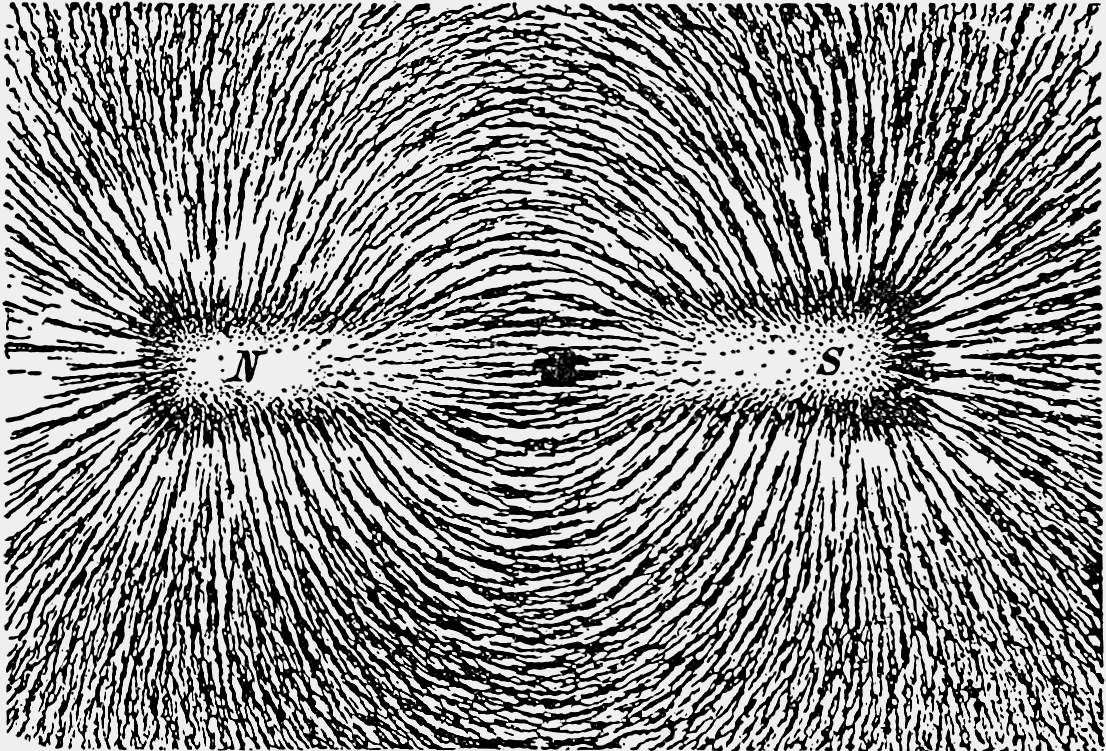
Left: the direction of magnetic field lines represented by iron filings sprinkled on paper placed above a bar magnet.
Right: compass needles point in the direction of the local magnetic field, towards a magnet's south pole and away from its north pole.

Magnetic field can be visualized by a set of magnetic field lines, that follow the direction of the field at each point. The direction of the magnetic field at any point is parallel to the direction of nearby field lines, and the local density of field lines can be made proportional to its strength. Magnetic field lines are like streamlines in fluid flow, in that they represent a continuous distribution, and a different resolution would show more or fewer lines.

An advantage of using magnetic field lines as a representation is that many laws of magnetism (and electromagnetism) can be stated completely and concisely using simple concepts such as the "number" of field lines through a surface. These concepts can then be "translated" to their mathematical form. For example, the number of field lines through a given surface is the surface integral of the magnetic field.

Various phenomena "display" magnetic field lines as though the field lines were physical phenomena. For example, iron filings placed in a magnetic field form lines that correspond to "field lines". Magnetic field "lines" are also visually displayed in polar auroras, in which plasma particle dipole interactions create visible streaks of light that line up with the local direction of Earth's magnetic field.

Field lines can be used as a qualitative tool to visualize magnetic forces. In ferromagnetic substances like iron and in plasmas, magnetic forces can be understood by imagining that the field lines exert a tension, (like a rubber band) along their length, and a pressure perpendicular to their length on neighboring field lines. "Unlike" poles of magnets attract because they are linked by many field lines; "like" poles repel because their field lines do not meet, but run parallel, pushing on each other.

== Divergence and curl ==
Field lines can be used to trace familiar quantities from vector calculus:

- Divergence may be easily seen through field lines, assuming the lines are drawn such that the density of field lines is proportional to the magnitude of the field (see above). In this case, the divergence may be seen as the beginning and ending of field lines. If the vector field is the resultant of radial inverse-square law fields with respect to one or more sources then this corresponds to the fact that the divergence of such a field is zero outside the sources. In a solenoidal vector field (i.e., a vector field where the divergence is zero everywhere), the field lines neither begin nor end; they either form closed loops, or go off to infinity in both directions. If a vector field has positive divergence in some area, there will be field lines starting from points in that area. If a vector field has negative divergence in some area, there will be field lines ending at points in that area.
- The Kelvin–Stokes theorem shows that field lines of a vector field with zero curl (i.e., a conservative vector field, e.g. a gravitational field or an electrostatic field) cannot be closed loops. In other words, curl is always present when a field line forms a closed loop. It may be present in other situations too, such as a helical shape of field lines.

== Physical significance ==
When randomly dropped (as with the shaker here), iron filings arrange themselves so as to approximately depict some magnetic field lines. The magnetic field is created by a permanent magnet underneath the glass surface.

While field lines are a "mere" mathematical construction, in some circumstances they take on physical significance. In fluid mechanics, the velocity field lines (streamlines) in steady flow represent the paths of particles of the fluid. In the context of plasma physics, electrons or ions that happen to be on the same field line interact readily, while particles on different field lines in general do not interact.

The iron filings in the photo appear to be aligning themselves with discrete field lines, but the situation is more complex. It is easy to visualize as a two-stage-process: first, the filings are spread evenly over the magnetic field but all aligned in the direction of the field. Then, based on the scale and ferromagnetic properties of the filings they damp the field to either side, creating the apparent spaces between the lines that we see. Of course the two stages described here happen concurrently until an equilibrium is achieved. Because the intrinsic magnetism of the filings modifies the field, the lines shown by the filings are only an approximation of the field lines of the original magnetic field. Magnetic fields are continuous, and do not have discrete lines.

== See also ==
- Force field (physics)
- Field lines of Julia sets
- External ray — field lines of Douady–Hubbard potential of Mandelbrot set or filled-in Julia sets
- Line of force
- Vector field
- Line integral convolution
