= Contrail (disambiguation) =

A contrail is a condensation trail caused by an aircraft.

Contrail or Contrails may also refer to:

- Contrail (company), a defunct video game developer
- Contrail (software), a Cloud Federation computing project
- "Contrail" (song), a song by Namie Amur
- Contrails (book), a handbook issued to new cadets entering the United States Air Force Academy
- Contrail (horse) (born 2017), Japanese Triple Crown-winning racehorse

== See also ==
- Distrail
- Vapor Trail (disambiguation)
