= Tensor glyph =

Visual aid used in mathematics

In scientific visualization a tensor glyph is an object that can visualize all or most of the nine degrees of freedom, such as acceleration, twist, or shear – of a $3 \times 3$ matrix. It is used for tensor field visualization, where a data-matrix is available at every point in the grid. "Glyphs, or icons, depict multiple data values by mapping them onto the shape, size, orientation, and surface appearance of a base geometric primitive." Tensor glyphs are a particular case of multivariate data glyphs.

There are certain types of glyphs that are commonly used:

- Ellipsoid
- Cuboid
- Cylindrical
- Superquadrics

According to Thomas Schultz and Gordon Kindlmann, specific types of tensor fields "play a central role in scientific and biomedical studies as well as in image analysis and feature-extraction methods."
