= Glyph (data visualization) =

Visual representation of a piece of data

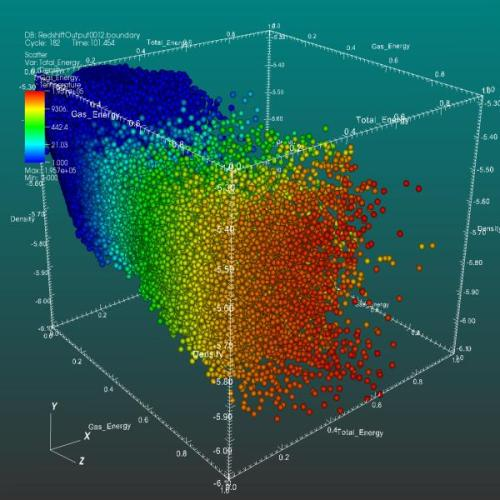
Four-dimensional data visualization, using VisIt: in three-dimensional phase space a fourth scalar variable is visualized by use of coloured glyphs.

In the context of data visualization, a glyph is any marker, such as an arrow or similar marking, used to specify part of a visualization. This is a representation to visualize data where the data set is presented as a collection of visual objects. These visual objects are collectively called a glyph. It helps visualizing data relation in data analysis, statistics, etc. by using any custom notation.

In the context of data visualization, a glyph is the visual representation of a piece of data where the attributes of a graphical entity are dictated by one or more attributes of a data record.

— Matthew O. Ward, Multivariate data glyphs: Principles and practice, In: Handbook of data visualization (2008), p.180.

== Constructing glyphs ==
Glyph construction can be a complex process when there are many dimensions to be represented in the visualization. Maguire et al proposed a taxonomy based approach to glyph-design that uses a tree to guide the visual encodings used to representation various data items.

Duffy et al created perhaps one of the most complex glyph representations with their representation of sperm movement.
