= Lagrangian–Eulerian advection =

Visualization method

In scientific visualization, Lagrangian–Eulerian advection is a technique mainly used for the visualization of unsteady flows. The computer graphics generated by the technique can help scientists visualize changes in velocity fields. This technique uses a hybrid Lagrangian and Eulerian specification of the flow field. It is a special case of a line integral convolution.

The method consists of using nearest-neighbour interpolation followed by an error correction mechanism. The Lagrangian specification is used during the integration to update the particle positions. The property of interest is advected in the Eulerian frame of reference. It was originally designed by Bruno Jobard and others for steady flows but was extended to unsteady flows.

The main idea is to create a white noise texture of the desired resolution, which is used as a base, on top of which the vector field can be applied. That means for every particle looking backward in the vector field to find out the new value for the cell it is contained in. Then looking forward – to calculate the new position of the particle in the cell.

In its application, the Lagrangian–Eulerian method can be accelerated using the GPUs used in common chipsets present in Nvidia and ATI Radeon graphics cards.

Ensuring that the moving texture always follows the velocity field of the fluid, while maintaining properties of the original texture, is key to avoid visual artifacts. A new method developed in 2009 improves the results of the previous one, running real-time.

== See also ==
- Lagrangian analysis
- Lagrangian drifter
