= Gordon Kindlmann =

American computer scientist

- Citizenship: United States
- Education: Cornell University; University of Utah
- Known for: Tensor glyph Teem software library Diderot DSL
- Scientific career
- Fields: Computer science, information visualization
- Workplaces: University of Chicago; Harvard Medical School; Scientific Computing and Imaging Institute; University of Chicago
- Thesis: Visualization and Analysis of Diffusion Tensor Fields (2004)
- Doctoral advisor: Christopher R. Johnson

Gordon L. Kindlmann is an American computer scientist who works on information visualization and image analysis. He is recognized for his contributions in developing tools for tensor data visualization.

== Biography ==
Gordon Kindlmann graduated from Cornell University with a BA in mathematics in 1995 and a MS in computer graphics in 1998. He then attended the University of Utah for his PhD, where he worked at the Scientific Computing and Imaging Institute under Christopher R. Johnson and graduated in 2004. While at Utah, he developed a set of methods for visualizing volumetric data interactively using multidimensional transfer functions, which were each cited over 500 times.

Following his PhD, he was a post-doctoral research fellow in the Laboratory of Mathematics in Imaging at Brigham and Women's Hospital affiliated with Harvard Medical School, where he developed the tensor glyph, a scientific visualization tool for visualizing the degrees of freedom of a $3 \times 3$. His work in diffusion tensor MRI visualization was included in a chapter of The Visualization Handbook. He joined the computer science faculty at the University of Chicago as an assistant professor in 2009, where he teaches an acclaimed course on Scientific Visualization.

In 2013, Kindlmann appeared in Computer Chess, an independent comedy-drama film written and directed by Andrew Bujalski about a group of software engineers in 1980 who write programs to compete in computer chess. The film premiered at the 2013 Sundance Film Festival, where it won the Alfred P. Sloan Prize, and subsequently screened at SXSW and the Maryland Film Festival.
