= Stonethrow Ridge =

Ridge in Antarctica

Coordinates: 62°58′S 60°44′W

Stonethrow Ridge is a snow-covered ridge rising west of Fumarole Bay on Deception Island, in the South Shetland Islands of Antarctica. Vapour Col lies to the south of the ridge.

The name 'Stonethrow' arose following a survey by the Falkland Islands Dependencies Survey (FIDS) in January 1954 because of the large number of rocks and stones at the base of the steep east face which have been thrown off the ridge.

== Antarctic Specially Protected Area ==
The western part of the ridge forms part of an Antarctic Specially Protected Area (ASPA 140), comprising several separate sites on Deception Island, and designated as such primarily for its botanic and ecological values.
