= Streamlet (scientific visualization) =

In scientific visualization a streamlet is used to visualize flows. It is essentially a short streamline segment. Normally the length of a streamlet is proportional to the flow magnitude at its seed point.
