= Lambda2 method =

Mathematical algorithm

The Lambda2 method, or Lambda2 vortex criterion, is a vortex core line detection algorithm that can adequately identify vortices from a three-dimensional fluid velocity field. The Lambda2 method is Galilean invariant, which means it produces the same results when a uniform velocity field is added to the existing velocity field or when the field is translated.

== Description ==
The flow velocity of a fluid is a vector field which is used to mathematically describe the motion of a continuum. The length of the flow velocity vector is the flow speed and is a scalar. The flow velocity $\mathbf{u}$ of a fluid is a vector field

$$\mathbf{u}=\mathbf{u}(x, y, z, t),$$

which gives the velocity of an element of fluid at a position $(x, y, z)\,$ and time $t.\,$ The Lambda2 method determines for any point $\mathbf{u}$ in the fluid whether this point is part of a vortex core. A vortex is now defined as a connected region for which every point inside this region is part of a vortex core.

Usually one will also obtain a large number of small vortices when using the above definition. In order to detect only real vortices, a threshold can be used to discard any vortices below a certain size (e.g. volume or number of points contained in the vortex).

== Definition ==
The Lambda2 method consists of several steps. First we define the velocity gradient tensor $\mathbf{J}$;

$$\mathbf{J} \equiv \nabla \vec{u} =
\begin{bmatrix}
\partial_x u_x & \partial_y u_x & \partial_z u_x  \\
\partial_x u_y & \partial_y u_y & \partial_z u_y  \\
\partial_x u_z & \partial_y u_z & \partial_z u_z
\end{bmatrix},$$

where $\vec{u}$ is the velocity field. The velocity gradient tensor is then decomposed into its symmetric and antisymmetric parts:

$\mathbf{S} = \frac{\mathbf{J} + \mathbf{J}^\text{T}}{2}$ and $\mathbf{\Omega} = \frac{\mathbf{J} - \mathbf{J}^\text{T}}{2},$

where T is the transpose operation. Next the three eigenvalues of $\mathbf{S}^2 + \mathbf{\Omega}^2$ are calculated so that for each point in the velocity field $\vec{u}$ there are three corresponding eigenvalues; $\lambda_1$, $\lambda_2$ and $\lambda_3$. The eigenvalues are ordered in such a way that $\lambda_1 \geq \lambda_2 \geq \lambda_3$. A point in the velocity field is part of a vortex core only if at least two of its eigenvalues are negative i.e. if $\lambda_2 < 0$. This is what gave the Lambda2 method its name.

Using the Lambda2 method, a vortex can be defined as a connected region where $\lambda_2$ is negative. However, in situations where several vortices exist, it can be difficult for this method to distinguish between individual vortices . The Lambda2 method has been used in practice to, for example, identify vortex rings present in the blood flow inside the human heart
