= Streamsurface =

Phenomenon in fluid dynamics

In fluid dynamics a stream surface is a surface across which no flow occurs. A stream surface may be one of two types:

- A boundary-type stream surface coincides with the impermeable boundary of a physical object other than the fluid itself. The object may be rigid or flexible, and it may be mobile or immobile. Examples include the wall of a fluid-filled channel or pipe, the wall of a rigid buoy drifting in a water body, and the wall of a balloon floating in the atmosphere.
- An internal stream surface does not coincide with a physical object other than the fluid. Fluid flows on either side of the surface, but does not cross it.

In scientific visualization a stream surface is the 3D generalization of a streamline. It is the union of all streamlines seeded densely on a curve. Like a streamline, a stream surface is used to visualize flows – three-dimensional flows in this case. Specifically, it is "the locus of an infinite set of such curves [streamlines], rooted at every point along a continuous originating line segment."
