= Contrails (book) =

Contrails is a small handbook issued to new cadets entering the United States Air Force Academy. It contains information on United States Air Force and United States military history; Academy history; notable Academy graduates; aircraft, satellites, and munitions in the current U.S. Air Force inventory; transcripts of important national documents such as the Preamble to the Constitution and the full national anthem; and famous quotes, which are usually patriotic or leadership-related. Cadets in their fourth class (freshman) year are expected to learn most of the information from Contrails, and be able to recite much of it verbatim. Contrails has traditionally been published in the class color—Blue, Silver, Red, or Gold—of the freshman class.
