= Elementary flow =

In the larger context of the Navier-Stokes equations (and especially in the context of potential theory), elementary flows are basic flows that can be combined, using various techniques, to construct more complex flows. In this article the term "flow" is used interchangeably with the term "solution" due to historical reasons.

The techniques involved to create more complex solutions can be for example by superposition, by techniques such as topology or considering them as local solutions on a certain neighborhood, subdomain or boundary layer and to be patched together. Elementary flows can be considered the basic building blocks (fundamental solutions, local solutions and solitons) of the different types of equations derived from the Navier-Stokes equations. Some of the flows reflect specific constraints such as incompressible or irrotational flows, or both, as in the case of potential flow, and some of the flows may be limited to the case of two dimensions.

Due to the relationship between fluid dynamics and field theory, elementary flows are relevant not only to aerodynamics but to all field theory in general. To put it in perspective boundary layers can be interpreted as topological defects on generic manifolds, and considering fluid dynamics analogies and limit cases in electromagnetism, quantum mechanics and general relativity one can see how all these solutions are at the core of recent developments in theoretical physics such as the ads/cft duality, the SYK model, the physics of nematic liquids, strongly correlated systems and even to quark gluon plasmas.

== Two-dimensional uniform flow ==
Potential flow streamlines for an ideal uniform flow

For steady-state, spatially uniform flow of a fluid in the xy plane, the velocity vector is

$$\mathbf{v} = v_0 \cos(\theta_0)\, \mathbf{e}_x +v_0 \sin(\theta_0)\, \mathbf{e}_y$$

where

$v_0$ is the absolute magnitude of the velocity (i.e., $v_0 = |\mathbf{v}|$);
$\theta_0$ is the angle the velocity vector makes with the positive x axis ($\theta_0$ is positive for angles measured in a counterclockwise sense from the positive x axis); and
$\mathbf{e}_x$ and $\mathbf{e}_y$ are the unit basis vectors of the xy coordinate system.

Because this flow is incompressible (i.e., $\nabla \cdot \mathbf{v} = 0$) and two-dimensional, its velocity can be expressed in terms of a stream function, $\psi$:

$$v_x = \frac {\partial \psi} {\partial y}$$
$$v_y = - \frac {\partial \psi} {\partial x}$$

where

$$\psi = \psi_0 - v_0 \sin (\theta_0)\, x + v_0 \cos (\theta_0)\, y$$

and $\psi_0$ is a constant.

In cylindrical coordinates:

$$v_r = - \frac 1 r \frac{\partial \psi} {\partial \theta}$$
$$v_\theta = \frac{\partial \psi} {\partial r}$$

and

$$\psi = \psi_0 + v_0\, r \sin (\theta - \theta_0)$$

This flow is irrotational (i.e., $\nabla \times \mathbf{v} = \mathbf{0}$) so its velocity can be expressed in terms of a potential function, $\phi$:

$$v_x = - \frac{\partial \phi} {\partial x}$$
$$v_y = - \frac {\partial \phi} {\partial y}$$

where

$$\phi = \phi_0 - v_0 \cos (\theta_0)\, x - v_0 \sin (\theta_0)\, y$$

and $\phi_0$ is a constant.

In cylindrical coordinates

$$v_r =  \frac {\partial \phi} {\partial r}$$
$$v_\theta =  \frac {1}{r} \frac {\partial \phi} {\partial \theta}$$

$$\phi = \phi_0 - v_0\, r \cos(\theta - \theta_0)$$

== Two-dimensional line source ==
Potential flow streamlines for an ideal line source

The case of a vertical line emitting at a fixed rate a constant quantity of fluid Q per unit length is a line source. The problem has a cylindrical symmetry and can be treated in two dimensions on the orthogonal plane.

Line sources and line sinks (below) are important elementary flows because they play the role of monopole for incompressible fluids (which can also be considered examples of solenoidal fields i.e. divergence free fields). Generic flow patterns can be also de-composed in terms of multipole expansions, in the same manner as for electric and magnetic fields where the monopole is essentially the first non-trivial (e.g. constant) term of the expansion.

This flow pattern is also both irrotational and incompressible.

This is characterized by a cylindrical symmetry:

$$\mathbf{v} = v_r(r) \mathbf{e}_r$$

Where the total outgoing flux is constant

$$\int_S \mathbf{v} \cdot d \mathbf{S} = \int_{0}^{2 \pi} ( v_r(r) \, \mathbf{e}_r ) \cdot ( \mathbf{e}_r \, r \, d \theta ) = \! 2 \pi \, r \, v_r(r) = Q$$

Therefore,

$$v_r = \frac {Q}{2 \pi r}$$

This is derived from a stream function

$$\psi(r,\theta) = -\frac{Q}{2 \pi } \theta$$

or from a potential function

$$\phi(r,\theta) = -\frac{Q}{2 \pi }  \ln r$$

== Two-dimensional line sink ==
The case of a vertical line absorbing at a fixed rate a constant quantity of fluid Q per unit length is a line sink. Everything is the same as the case of a line source a part from the negative sign.

$$v_r = - \frac {Q}{2 \pi r}$$

This is derived from a stream function

$$\psi(r,\theta) = \frac{Q}{2 \pi } \theta$$

or from a potential function

$$\phi(r,\theta) = \frac{Q}{2 \pi }  \ln r$$

Given that the two results are the same a part from a minus sign we can treat transparently both line sources and line sinks with the same stream and potential functions permitting Q to assume both positive and negative values and absorbing the minus sign into the definition of Q.

== Two-dimensional doublet or dipole line source ==
Potential flow streamlines for an ideal doublet, or dipole, line

If we consider a line source and a line sink at a distance d we can reuse the results above and the stream function will be

$$\psi(\mathbf{r}) = \psi_Q(\mathbf{r} - \mathbf{d}/2) - \psi_Q(\mathbf{r} + \mathbf{d}/2) \ \simeq \mathbf{d} \cdot \nabla \psi_Q(\mathbf{r})$$

The last approximation is to the first order in d.

Given

$$\mathbf{d} = d [ \cos (\theta_0) \mathbf{e}_x + \sin (\theta_0) \mathbf{e}_y] = d [ \cos (\theta-\theta_0) \mathbf{e}_r + \sin (\theta-\theta_0) \mathbf{e}_\theta]$$

It remains

$$\psi(r,\theta) = - \frac{Q d}{2 \pi} \frac{\sin(\theta-\theta_0)}{r}$$

The velocity is then

$$v_r(r,\theta) = \frac{Q d}{2 \pi} \frac{\cos(\theta-\theta_0)}{r^2}$$
$$v_\theta(r,\theta) = \frac{Q d}{2 \pi} \frac{\sin(\theta-\theta_0)}{r^2}$$

And the potential instead

$$\phi(r,\theta) = \frac{Q d}{2 \pi} \frac{\cos(\theta-\theta_0)}{r}$$

== Two-dimensional vortex line ==
Potential flow streamlines for an ideal vortex line

This is the case of a vortex filament rotating at constant speed, there is a cylindrical symmetry and the problem can be solved in the orthogonal plane.

Dual to the case above of line sources, vortex lines play the role of monopoles for irrotational flows.

Also in this case the flow is also both irrotational and incompressible and therefore a case of potential flow.

This is characterized by a cylindrical symmetry:

$$\mathbf{v} = v_\theta(r) \, \mathbf{e}_\theta$$

Where the total circulation is constant for every closed line around the central vortex

$$\oint \mathbf{v} \cdot d \mathbf{s} = \int_{0}^{2 \pi} (v_\theta(r) \, \mathbf{e}_\theta) \cdot (\mathbf{e}_\theta \, r \, d\theta) = \! 2 \pi \, r\, v_\theta(r) = \Gamma$$

and is zero for any line not including the vortex.

Therefore,

$$v_\theta = \frac {\Gamma}{2 \pi r}$$

This is derived from a stream function

$$\psi(r,\theta) = \frac{\Gamma}{2 \pi }  \ln r$$

or from a potential function

$$\phi(r,\theta) = - \frac{\Gamma}{2 \pi } \theta$$

Which is dual to the previous case of a line source

== Generic two-dimensional potential flow ==
Given an incompressible two-dimensional flow which is also irrotational we have:

$$\nabla^2 \psi = 0$$

Which is in cylindrical coordinates

$$\frac{1}{r} \frac{\partial}{\partial r} \left(r \frac{\partial \psi}{\partial r}\right) + \frac{1}{r^2} \frac{\partial^2 \psi}{\partial \theta^2}= 0$$

We look for a solution with separated variables:

$$\psi(r,\theta) = R(r) \Theta(\theta)$$

which gives

$$\frac{r}{R(r)} \frac{d}{dr} \left(r \frac{d R(r)}{dr}\right) = -\frac{1}{\Theta(\theta)} \frac{d^2 \Theta(\theta)}{d\theta^2}$$

Given the left part depends only on r and the right parts depends only on $\theta$, the two parts must be equal to a constant independent from r and $\theta$. The constant shall be positive. Therefore,

$$r \frac{d}{dr} \left(r \frac{d}{dr} R(r)\right) = m^2 R(r)$$
$$\frac{d^2 \Theta(\theta)}{d\theta^2} = - m^2 \Theta(\theta)$$

The solution to the second equation is a linear combination of $e^{i m \theta}$ and $e^{-i m \theta}$ In order to have a single-valued velocity (and also a single-valued stream function) m shall be a positive integer.

therefore the most generic solution is given by

$$\psi = \alpha_0 + \beta_0 \ln r + \sum_{m > 0}{\left(\alpha_m r^m + \beta_m r^{-m}\right)\sin {[m(\theta -
\theta_m)]}}$$

The potential is instead given by

$$\phi = \alpha_0 - \beta_0 \theta + \sum_{m \mathop > 0}{(\alpha_m r^m - \beta_m r^{-m})\cos {[m(\theta -
\theta_m)]}}$$
