= Vapor Trail (disambiguation) =

A vapor trail, or contrail, is a condensation trail made by the exhaust of an aircraft engine.

Vapor Trail or Vapour Trail may also refer to:

== Music ==
- Hikō-ki Gumo (Japanese for "Vapor Trail"), an album by Yumi Arai, or the title song, 1973
- "Vapour Trail" (song), by Ride, 1990
- Vapor Trails, an album by Rush, or the title song, 2002
- Vapour Trails, an album by Tuxedomoon, 2007
- "Vapor Trail", a song by The Crystal Method from Vegas
- "Vapour Trails", a song by the Tragically Hip from Phantom Power

== Other uses ==
- Vapor Trail (roller coaster), at Sesame Place in Langhorne, Pennsylvania, US
- Vapor Trail: Hyper Offence Formation, a 1989 video game by Data East

== See also ==
- Contrail (disambiguation)
