= Vapour Col =

Col of Antarctica

Coordinates: 62°59′S 60°44′W

Vapour Col is a col lying south of Stonethrow Ridge on the west side of Deception Island in the South Shetland Islands of Antarctica. The name given by the United Kingdom Antarctic Place-Names Committee (UK-APC) in 1959 originates from the fumaroles in the col. This is the only locality on Deception Island where there is a complete cross section through the stratigraphy of volcanic succession. Having a similar name in the same island is the Fumarole Bay (also known in the Spanish language as Bahía Primero de Mayo).

== Important Bird Area ==
A 148 tract of ice-free land rising steeply from the south-western shore of Deception Island to 340 m, and including Vapour Col, has been identified an Important Bird Area (IBA) by BirdLife International because it supports a large breeding colony of about 75,000 pairs of chinstrap penguins.
