= IEEE Visualization =

- Abbreviation: VIS
- Discipline: Visualization

Publication details
- Publisher: IEEE Computer Society
- History: 1990-present
- Frequency: Annual

The IEEE Visualization Conference (VIS) is an annual conference on scientific visualization, information visualization, and visual analytics administrated by the IEEE Computer Society Technical Committee on Visualization and Graphics. As ranked by Google Scholar's h-index metric in 2016, VIS is the highest rated venue for visualization research and the second-highest rated conference for computer graphics over all. It has an 'A' rating from the Australian Ranking of ICT Conferences, an 'A' rating from the Brazilian ministry of education, and an 'A' rating from the China Computer Federation (CCF). The conference is highly selective with generally < 25% acceptance rates for all papers.

An image dataset, VIS30K, has been created from figures and tables in the conference publications.

In 2016, the VIS Executive Committee initiated a review of conference structures, which led to community consultations and the formation of a committee in 2019, which successfully consolidated the three conferences (SciVis, InfoVis, VAST) under one conference at VIS 2021. Since the VIS 2021 conference a new unified full paper track with six specific areas and a consolidated review process is used. The unification of the conference structure aims to streamline experiences, simplify organizational processes, enhance flexibility in the evolution of topics, and provide a cohesive view of visualization fields.

== Location ==
The conference is typically held at the end of October. In 2014, for its 25th anniversary, the conference took place for the first time outside of the US, namely in Paris. Since then, the conference typically rotates around the US and also moves international about every third year.

List of conferences:

- 2031: Atlanta, Georgia, United States (planned)
- 2030: Salt Lake City, Utah, United States (planned)
- 2029: Knoxville, Tennessee, United States (planned)
- 2028: Seoul, South Korea (planned)
- 2027: Chicago, United States (planned)
- 2026: Boston, United States
- 2025: Vienna, Austria
- 2024: St. Pete Beach, Florida, United States (moved online due to Hurricane Milton)
- 2023: Melbourne, Australia
- 2022: Oklahoma City, United States (hybrid)
- 2021: New Orleans, United States (online)
- 2020: Salt Lake City, United States (online)
- 2019: Vancouver, Canada
- 2018: Berlin, Germany
- 2017: Phoenix, Arizona, United States
- 2016: Baltimore, Maryland, United States
- 2015: Chicago, Illinois, United States
- 2014: Paris, France
- 2013: Atlanta, Georgia, United States
- 2012: Seattle, Washington, United States
- 2011: Providence, Rhode Island, United States
- 2010: Salt Lake City, Utah, United States
- 2009: Atlantic City, New Jersey, United States
- 2008: Columbus, Ohio, United States
- 2007: Sacramento, California, United States
- 2006: Baltimore, Maryland, United States
- 2005: Minneapolis, Minnesota, United States
- 2004: Austin, Texas, United States
- 2003: Seattle, Washington, United States
- 2002: Boston, Massachusetts, United States
- 2001: San Diego, California, United States
- 2000: Salt Lake City, Utah, United States
- 1999: San Francisco, California, United States
- 1998: Research Triangle Park, North Carolina, United States
- 1997: Phoenix, Arizona, United States
- 1996: San Francisco, California, United States
- 1995: Atlanta, Georgia, United States
- 1994: Washington DC, United States
- 1993: San Jose, California, United States
- 1992: Boston, Massachusetts, United States
- 1991: San Diego, California, United States
- 1990: San Francisco, California, United States

== Awards ==
=== VIS Best Paper Award ===
2024:

- Entanglements for Visualization: Changing Research Outcomes through Feminist Theory: Derya Akbaba, Lauren Klein, Miriah Meyer
- Aardvark: Composite Visualizations of Trees, Time-Series, and Images: Devin Lange, Robert L Judson-Torres, Thomas A Zangle, Alexander Lex
- VisEval: A Benchmark for Data Visualization in the Era of Large Language Models: Nan Chen, Yuge Zhang, Jiahang Xu, Kan Ren, Yuqing Yang
- VADIS: A Visual Analytics Pipeline for Dynamic Document Representation and Information Seeking: Rui Qiu, Yamei Tu, Po-Yin Yen, Han-Wei Shen
- Rapid and Precise Topological Comparison with Merge Tree Neural Networks: Yu Qin, Brittany Terese Fasy, Carola Wenk, Brian Summa

2023:

- Affective Visualization Design: Leveraging the Emotional Impact of Data: Xingyu Lan, Yanqiu Wu, Nan Cao
- Fast Compressed Segmentation Volumes for Scientific Visualization: Max Piochowiak, Carsten Dachsbacher
- Swaying the Public? Impacts of Election Forecast Visualizations on Emotion, Trust, and Intention in the 2022 U.S. Midterms: Fumeng Yang, Mandi Cai, Chloe Rose Mortenson, Hoda Fakhari, Ayse Deniz Lokmanoglu, Jessica Hullman, Steven Franconeri, Nicholas Diakopoulos, Erik Nisbet, Matthew Kay
- TimeSplines: Sketch-based Authoring of Flexible and Idiosyncratic Timelines: Anna Offenwanger, Matthew Brehmer, Fanny Chevalier, Theophanis Tsandilas
- Visualization of Discontinuous Vector Field Topology: Egzon Miftari, Daniel Durstewitz, Filip Sadlo
- Vortex Lens: Interactive Vortex Core Line Extraction using Observed Line Integral Convolution: Peter Rautek, Xingdi Zhang, Bernhard Woschizka, Thomas Theussl, Markus Hadwiger

2022:

- Affective Learning Objectives for Communicative Visualizations: Elsie Lee-Robbins, Eytan Adar
- Multiple Forecast Visualizations (MFVs): Trade-offs in Trust and Performance in Multiple COVID-19 Forecast Visualizations: Lace Padilla, Racquel Fygenson, Spencer C. Castro, Enrico Bertini
- Uncertainty-Aware Multidimensional Scaling: David Hägele, Tim Krake, Daniel Weiskopf

2021:

- Feature Curves and Surfaces of 3D Asymmetric Tensor Fields: Shih-Hsuan Hung, Yue Zhang, Harry Yeh, Eugene Zhang
- IRVINE: Using Interactive Clustering and Labeling to Analyze Correlation Patterns: A Design Study from the Manufacturing of Electrical Engines: Joscha Eirich, Jakob Bonart, Dominik Jäckle, Michael Sedlmair, Ute Schmid, Kai Fischbach, Tobias Schreck, Jürgen Bernard
- Perception! Immersion! Empowerment! Superpowers as Inspiration for Visualization: Wesley Willett, Bon Adriel Aseniero, Sheelagh Carpendale, Pierre Dragicevic, Yvonne Jansen, Lora Oehlberg, Petra Isenberg
- Simultaneous Matrix Orderings for Graph Collections: Nathan van Beusekom, Wouter Meulemans, Bettina Speckmann

2020:

- VAST
  - VATLD: A Visual Analytics System to Assess, Understand and Improve Traffic Light Detection: Liang Gou, Lincan Zou, Nanxiang Li, Michael Hofmann, Shekar Arvind Kumar, Axel Wendt, and Liu Ren
- InfoVis
  - Visual Reasoning Strategies and Satisficing: How Uncertainty Visualization Design Impacts Effect Size Judgments and Decisions: Alex Kale, Matthew Kay, and Jessica Hullman
- SciVis
  - Objective Observer-Relative Flow Visualization in Curved Spaces for Unsteady 2D Geophysical Flows: Peter Rautek, Matej Mlejnek, Johanna Beyer, Jakob Troidl, Hanspeter Pfister, Thomas Theussl, Markus Hadwiger

2019:

- VAST
  - FlowSense: A Natural Language Interface for Visual Data Exploration within a Dataflow System: Bowen Yu, Claudio Silva
- InfoVis
  - Data Changes Everything: Challenges and Opportunities in Data Visualization Design Handoff: Jagoda Walny, Christian Frisson, Mieka West, Doris Kosminsky, Søren Knudsen, Sheelagh Carpendale, Wesley Willett
- SciVis
  - InSituNet: Deep Image Synthesis for Parameter Space Exploration of Ensemble Simulations: Wenbin He, Junpeng Wang, Hanqi Guo, Ko-Chih Wang, Han-Wei Shen, Mukund Raj, Youssef S. G. Nashed, Tom Peterka

2018:

- VAST
  - TPFlow: Progressive Partition and Multidimensional Pattern Extraction for Large-Scale Spatio-Temporal Data Analysis, Dongyu Liu, Panpan Xu, Liu Ren
- InfoVis
  - Formalizing Visualization Design Knowledge as Constraints: Actionable and Extensible Models in Draco, Dominik Moritz, Chenglong Wang, Greg L. Nelson, Halden Lin, Adam M. Smith, Bill Howe, Jeffrey Heer
- SciVis
  - Deadeye: A Novel Preattentive Visualization Technique Based on Dichoptic Presentation Authors: Andrey Krekhov, Jens Krüger

2017:

- VAST
  - Visualizing Dataflow Graphs of Deep Learning Models in TensorFlow, Kanit Wongsuphasawat, Daniel Smilkov, James Wexler, Jimbo Wilson, Dandelion Mané, Doug Fritz, Dilip Krishnan, Fernanda B. Viégas, and Martin Wattenberg
- InfoVis
  - Modeling Color Difference for Visualization Design, Danielle Albers Szafir
- SciVis
  - Globe Browsing: Contextualized Spatio-Temporal Planetary Surface Visualization, Karl Bladin, Emil Axelsson, Erik Broberg, Carter Emmart, Patric Ljung, Alexander Bock, and Anders Ynnerman

2016:

- VAST
  - An Analysis of Machine- and Human-Analytics in Classification, Gary K.L. Tam, Vivek Kothari, Min Chen
- InfoVis
  - Vega-Lite: A Grammar of Interactive Graphics, Arvind Satyanarayan, Dominik Moritz, Kanit Wongsuphasawat, and Jeffrey Heer
- SciVis
  - Jacobi Fiber Surfaces for Bivariate Reeb Space Computation, Julien Tierny and Hamish Carr

2015

- VAST
  - Reducing Snapshots to Points: A Visual Analytics Approach to Dynamic Network Exploration, Stef van den Elzen, Danny Holten, Jorik Blaas, Jarke van Wijk
- InfoVis
  - HOLA: Human-like Orthogonal Network Layout, Steve Kieffer, Tim Dwyer, Kim Marriott, Michael Wybrow
- SciVis
  - Visualization-by-Sketching: An Artist’s Interface for Creating Multivariate Time-Varying Data, David Schroeder, Daniel Keefe

2014

- VAST
  - Supporting Communication and Coordination in Collaborative Sensemaking, Narges Mahyar, Melanie Tory
- InfoVis
  - Multivariate Network Exploration and Presentation: From Detail to Overview via Selections and Aggregations, Stef van den Elzen, Jarke van Wijk
- SciVis
  - Visualization of Brain Microstructure through Spherical Harmonics Illumination of High Fidelity Spatio-Angular Fields, Sujal Bista, Jiachen Zhou, Rao Gullapalli, Amitabh Varshney

2013

- VAST
  - A Partition-Based Framework for Building and Validating Regression Models, Thomas Muhlbacher, Harald Piringer
- InfoVis
  - LineUp: Visual Analysis of Multi-Attribute Rankings, Samuel Gratzl, Alexander Lex, Nils Gehlenborg, Hanspeter Pfister, Marc Streit
- SciVis
  - Comparative Visual Analysis of Lagrangian Transport in CFD Ensembles, Mathias Hummel, Harald Obermaier, Christoph Garth, Kenneth I. Joy

=== Technical Achievement Award ===
Past recipients:

- 2024 - Bongshin Lee, Han-Wei Shen
- 2023 - Huamin Qu, Silvia Miksch
- 2022 - Valerio Pascucci, Shixia Liu
- 2021 - Daniel Weiskopf
- 2020 - Jean-Daniel Fekete
- 2019 - Eduard Gröller
- 2018 - Anders Ynnerman
- 2017 - Jeffrey Heer
- 2016 - David Ebert
- 2015 - Tamara Munzner
- 2014 - Claudio T. Silva
- 2013 - Kwan-Liu Ma
- 2012 - John Stasko
- 2011 - Daniel A. Keim
- 2010 - Hanspeter Pfister
- 2009 - Jock D. Mackinlay
- 2008 - David Laidlaw
- 2007 - Jarke van Wijk
- 2006 - Thomas Ertl
- 2005 - Charles D. Hansen
- 2004 - Amitabh Varshney

=== Career Award ===
To earn the IEEE VGTC Visualization Career Award, an individual must demonstrate that their research and service has had broad impacts on the field over a long period of time. Since 2021 it is called Lifetime Achievement.

Past recipients:

- 2024 - Hans-Christian Hege and Min Chen
- 2023 - John Stasko
- 2022 - Colin Ware
- 2021 - Jarke van Wijk
- 2020 - Catherine Plaisant
- 2019 - Thomas Ertl
- 2018 - Sheelagh Carpendale
- 2017 - Charles D. Hansen
- 2016 - John C. Dill
- 2015 - Markus Gross
- 2014 - Kenneth Joy
- 2013 - Gregory M. Nielson
- 2012 - Ben Shneiderman
- 2011 - Frits Post
- 2010 - Christopher R. Johnson
- 2009 - Hans Hagen
- 2008 - Lawrence J. Rosenblum
- 2007 - Stuart Card
- 2006 - Pat Hanrahan
- 2005 - Arie Kaufman
- 2004 - Bill Lorensen
