= The Visualization Handbook =

Textbook for scientific visualization training

- Author: Charles D. Hansen; Christopher R. Johnson
- Language: English
- Subject: Scientific visualization Computer graphics
- Publisher: Elsevier
- Publication date: 2005
- Publication place: United States
- ISBN: 978-0-12-387582-2

The Visualization Handbook is a textbook by Charles D. Hansen and Christopher R. Johnson that serves as a survey of the field of scientific visualization by presenting the basic concepts and algorithms in addition to a current review of visualization research topics and tools. It is commonly used as a textbook for scientific visualization graduate courses. It is also commonly cited as a reference for scientific visualization and computer graphics in published papers, with almost 500 citations documented on Google Scholar.

== Table of Contents ==
- PART I - Introduction
1. Overview of Visualization - William J. Schroeder and Kenneth M. Martin
- PART II - Scalar Field Visualization: Isosurfaces
1. Accelerated Isosurface Extraction Approaches -Yarden Livnat
2. Time-Dependent Isosurface Extraction - Han-Wei Shen
3. Optimal Isosurface Extraction - Paolo Cignoni, Claudio Montani, Robert Scopigno, and Enrico Puppo
4. Isosurface Extraction Using Extrema Graphs - Takayuki Itoh and Koji Koyamada
5. Isosurfaces and Level-Sets - Ross Whitaker
- PART III - Scalar Field Visualization: Volume Rendering
1. Overview of Volume Rendering - Arie E. Kaufman and Klaus Mueller
2. Volume Rendering Using Splatting - Roger Crawfis, Daqing Xue, and Caixia Zhang
3. Multidimensional Transfer Functions for Volume Rendering - Joe Kniss, Gordon Kindlmann, and Charles D. Hansen
4. Pre-Integrated Volume Rendering - Martin Kraus and Thomas Ertl
5. Hardware-Accelerated Volume Rendering - Hanspeter Pfister
- PART IV - Vector Field Visualization
1. Overview of Flow Visualization - Daniel Weiskopf and Gordon Erlebacher
2. Flow Textures: High-Resolution Flow Visualization - Gordon Erlebacher, Bruno Jobard, and Daniel Weiskopf
3. Detection and Visualization of Vortices - Ming Jiang, Raghu Machiraju, and David Thompson
- PART V - Tensor Field Visualization
1. Oriented Tensor Reconstruction - Leonid Zhukov and Alan H. Barr
2. Diffusion Tensor MRI Visualization - Song Zhang, David Laidlaw, and Gordon Kindlmann
3. Topological Methods for Flow Visualization - Gerik Scheuermann and Xavier Tricoche
- PART VI - Geometric Modeling for Visualization
1. 3D Mesh Compression - Jarek Rossignac
2. Variational Modeling Methods for Visualization - Hans Hagen and Ingrid Hotz
3. Model Simplification - Jonathan D. Cohen and Dinesh Manocha
- PART VII - Virtual Environments for Visualization
1. Direct Manipulation in Virtual Reality - Steve Bryson
2. The Visual Haptic Workbench - Milan Ikits and J. Dean Brederson
3. Virtual Geographic Information Systems - William Ribarsky
4. Visualization Using Virtual Reality - R. Bowen Loftin, Jim X. Chen, and Larry Rosenblum
- PART VIII - Large-Scale Data Visualization
1. Desktop Delivery: Access to Large Datasets - Philip D. Heermann and Constantine Pavlakos
2. Techniques for Visualizing Time-Varying Volume Data - Kwan-Liu Ma and Eric B. Lum
3. Large-Scale Data Visualization and Rendering: A Problem-Driven Approach - Patrick McCormick and James Ahrens
4. Issues and Architectures in Large-Scale Data Visualization - Constantine Pavlakos and Philip D. Heermann
5. Consuming Network Bandwidth with Visapult - Wes Bethel and John Shalf
- PART IX - Visualization Software and Frameworks
1. The Visualization Toolkit - William J. Schroeder and Kenneth M. Martin
2. Visualization in the SCIRun Problem-Solving Environment - David M. Weinstein, Steven Parker, Jenny Simpson, Kurt Zimmerman, and Greg M. Jones
3. Numerical Algorithms Group IRIS Explorer - Jeremy Walton
4. AVS and AVS/Express - Jean M. Favre and Mario Valle
5. Vis5D, Cave5D, and VisAD - Bill Hibbard
6. Visualization with AVS - W. T. Hewitt, Nigel W. John, Matthew D. Cooper, K. Yien Kwok, George W. Leaver, Joanna M. Leng, Paul G. Lever, Mary J. McDerby, James S. Perrin, Mark Riding, I. Ari Sadarjoen, Tobias M. Schiebeck, and Colin C. Venters
7. ParaView: An End-User Tool for Large-Data Visualization - James Ahrens, Berk Geveci, and Charles Law
8. The Insight Toolkit: An Open-Source Initiative in Data Segmentation and Registration - Terry S. Yoo
9. amira: A Highly Interactive System for Visual Data Analysis - Detlev Stalling, Malte Westerhoff, and Hans-Christian Hege
- PART X - Perceptual Issues in Visualization
1. Extending Visualization to Perceptualization: The Importance of Perception in Effective Communication of Information - David S. Ebert
2. Art and Science in Visualization - Victoria Interrante
3. Exploiting Human Visual Perception in Visualization - Alan Chalmers and Kirsten Cater
- PART XI - Selected Topics and Applications
1. Scalable Network Visualization - Stephen G. Eick
2. Visual Data-Mining Techniques - Daniel A. Keim, Mike Sips, and Mihael Ankerst
3. Visualization in Weather and Climate Research - Don Middleton, Tim Scheitlin, and Bob Wilhelmson
4. Painting and Visualization - Robert M. Kirby, Daniel F. Keefe, and David Laidlaw
5. Visualization and Natural Control Systems for Microscopy - Russell M. Taylor II, David Borland, Frederick P. Brooks, Jr., Mike Falvo, Kevin Jeffay, Gail Jones, David Marshburn, Stergios J. Papadakis, Lu-Chang Qin, Adam Seeger, F. Donelson Smith, Dianne Sonnenwald, Richard Superfine, Sean Washburn, Chris Weigle, Mary Whitton, Leandra Vicci, Martin Guthold, Tom Hudson, Philip Williams, and Warren Robinett
6. Visualization for Computational Accelerator Physics - Kwan-Liu Ma, Greg Schussman, and Brett Wilson

== See also ==
- Numerical Recipes
- Computer Graphics: Principles and Practice
