= Allison A. Campbell =

American chemist

- Born: 1963 (age 62–63); Portland, Oregon, U.S.
- Education: Gettysburg College; University at Buffalo
- Scientific career
- Fields: Chemistry
- Workplaces: Pacific Northwest National Laboratory
- Website: www.pnnl.gov/about/bio/AllisonCampbell.asp

Allison A. Campbell (born 1963, in Portland, Oregon) is an American chemist who is known in the areas of biomineralization, biomimetics and biomaterials for her innovative work on bioactive coatings for medical implants. She is the acting associate laboratory director for the Earth and Biological Sciences Directorate at the Pacific Northwest National Laboratory (PNNL) of the Department of Energy. She previously served as director of the Environmental Molecular Sciences Laboratory (EMSL) at PNNL. She was elected as the 2017 president of the American Chemical Society (ACS).

== Education ==
Campbell grew up in Portland, Oregon, in a medical family: her father was a pediatric surgeon and her mother a medical technician. Campbell received a Bachelor of Arts degree in chemistry from Gettysburg College in Pennsylvania in 1985. She then attended the State University of New York at Buffalo, working with George Nancollas to study biomineralization and the interaction of proteins with minerals at the molecular level. She defended her thesis in 1990 and received her doctorate in physical chemistry from the University at Buffalo in 1991.

== Career ==
In 1990 Campbell began a postdoctoral fellowship in the material sciences department of the Pacific Northwest National Laboratory (PNNL) in Richland, Washington. In 1992 she joined their staff as a research scientist. She applied techniques for growing thin films on surfaces to the development of bioactive coatings. Campbell's bioceramics promote the growth of a calcium phosphate layer over implant surfaces for artificial hip and knee implants, dental implants, and pins supporting broken bones, to prevent wear and prolong implant usability. Campbell holds several patents for this new technology. The coating also kills bacteria, reducing post-surgical infections. The process was licensed to Bacterin in 2004. Campbell's work was recognized with several awards.

In 1994, she was an invited researcher at the Research Group on Mechanics of Heterogeneous Solids of the Max Planck Society at the Technische Universität Dresden, Germany. She has taught at Whitman College, Walla Walla, Washington (1999) and at the University of Washington (2000-2008).

In 2000, Campbell became associate director of the Environmental Molecular Sciences Laboratory (EMSL) at PNNL, followed by interim director in 2004 and director in 2005. As a scientific user facility, EMSL's facilities are used by hundreds of scientists from around the world each year. Under Campbell's directorship, EMSL Campbell substantially expanded EMSL's resources, adding 32 scientific instruments at a cost of $60 million, expanding computing and office space, and opening a $7 million "Quiet Wing" and a Radiochemistry Annex.

Campbell is an associate laboratory director for the Earth and Biological Sciences Directorate at the Pacific Northwest National Laboratory (PNNL) of the Department of Energy, where she leads over 500 researchers and staff. She also oversees the Atmospheric Radiation Measurement (ARM) and Environmental Molecular Sciences Laboratory (EMSL) facilities of the Department of Energy. Their scientific work covers a broad range of initiatives in bioenergy, microbiology, biomedical science, environmental recovery, and climate science.

== Advocacy ==
Campbell advocates for federal support of science and chemistry research and education. On September 10, 2009, she testified to the United States House Committee on Science, Space and Technology's Subcommittee on Energy & Environment, as part of a Witness Panel discussion on Biological Research for Energy and Medical Applications at the Department of Energy Office of Science. She is a member of the Chemical Sciences Roundtable of the National Academies of Sciences, Engineering, and Medicine. As the 2017 president of the American Chemical Society (ACS) she has said she will work to educate both politicians and the public on the importance of the sciences as "potent forces for good in our world".

Science has become politicized to an unprecedented degree in the U.S. ACS has a central role to play in educating policy-makers and the public on the real contributions that chemistry makes every moment of every day to our high quality of life.

— Allison Campbell, 2015

== Awards and honors ==
Campbell has received a number of awards and honors including the following:

- 2013, Gettysburg College Distinguished Alumni Award
- 2012, Fellow of the American Association for the Advancement of Science (AAAS)
- 2011, Pioneer of Science Award (with George Nancollas), from Hauptman-Woodward Medical Research Institute in Buffalo, New York
- 2006, R&D 100 Award from R&D Magazine
- 2006, Federal Laboratory Consortium Award for Technology Transfer
- 2003, George W. Thorn Award from the State University of New York at Buffalo Alumni Association
- 2002, 12 Women at the Forefront of Chemistry, in celebration of the 75th anniversary of the ACS Women Chemist Committee (profiled in Chemical & Engineering News)
- 1984, Member of the American Chemical Society

== Other interests ==
Campbell represented the U.S. as an equestrienne in the Junior World Championships in 1987. She was also a contender for the U.S. Olympic equestrian team in 1988. Campbell has also advocated for greater LGBTQIA+ inclusion and support within STEM.

== Personal life ==
Campbell lives in Washington state with her wife, Julie. She is an avid cyclist and fly-fishing enthusiast.
