= Daniel A. Keim =

German computer scientist

- Born: 1965 (age 60–61); Gelsenkirchen
- Citizenship: German
- Education: LMU Munich (PhD)
- Known for: Data visualization
- Awards: IEEE VGTC Visualization Academy, Visualization Technical Achievement Award, IEEE VIS Test of Time Award
- Scientific career
- Fields: Computer science
- Workplaces: University of Konstanz, AT&T's Shannon Research Labs, Martin Luther University of Halle-Wittenberg, LMU Munich
- Website: www.vis.uni-konstanz.de/en

Daniel A. Keim is a German computer scientist well known for his work on information visualization, interactive data analysis and visual analytics. He is a professor of computer science and full professor in the Computer Science department at the University of Konstanz, Germany since 2000 where he directs the Data Analysis and Visualization Research Lab (DBVIS).

== Research and career ==
Keim received his Ph.D. in computer science from LMU Munich in 1994. He has been assistant professor in the Computer Science department at LMU Munich, and associate professor in the Computer Science department of the Martin Luther University of Halle-Wittenberg. Keim has also worked as a senior researcher at AT&T's Shannon Research Labs, Florham Park, NJ, USA.

Keim pioneered the field of visual data mining and co-created the field of visual analytics in the early 2000s. In 2006, Keim and Pak Chung Wong created the annual IEEE Visualization, providing a dedicated venue for research into visual analytics, which in 2020 merged to form the IEEE Visualization conference. In 2008, Keim together with Jim Thomas conceptually defined the scope and challenges of visual analytics in their influential book about visual data mining. He was the scientific coordinator of the European Commissions' Coordinated Action Project FP7 VisMaster starting 2010, which further refined the field. Keim has published extensively on topics specifically related to information visualization and data mining, and visual analytics, and has given tutorials and keynotes on related issues at several large visualization and data mining conferences.

== Data Analysis and Visualization Research Lab ==
Keim directs the Data Analysis and Visualization Research Lab (DBVIS) at the University of Konstanz, Germany, which is one of the leading interactive data analysis and visual analytics research labs in the world. The lab focuses on leveraging artificial intelligence, machine learning, and data science approaches in domains such as public safety and civil security, the Digital humanities and linguistics, sports and behavioral analytics, Geographic analytics and infrastructure analysis. Their research bridges data visualization, interactive human-AI collaboration, and intelligent data exploration through interactive, user-centered visual analytics approaches using techniques such as XAI, Reinforcement learning, and LLMs.

The lab has successfully acquired over 50 research grants from agencies such as the European Union (FFP7, Horizon 2020), the Federal Ministry of Education and Research (Germany), the Federal Ministry for Economic Affairs and Climate Action, the Federal Ministry for Housing, Urban Development and Building, as well as the German Research Foundation and the United States Department of Homeland Security.

== Positions and Awards ==
Keim has been inducted in 2019 as society member to the prestigious IEEE VGTC Visualization Academy. He was awarded the 2011 Visualization Technical Achievement Award as well as the 2024 IEEE VIS Test of Time Award Throughout his career, Keim contributed extensively to the visualization community through various leadership and organizational roles:

- steering committee member for IEEE Visualization (IEEE VIS, InfoVis, VAST), EuroVis, and EuroVA
- executive committee member of the IEEE Computer Society
- member of the Technical Committee on Visualization and Graphics
- program chair for a number of leading conferences in the field, such as IEEE Information Visualization, ACM SIGKDD among others.

Further he has served as associate editor and editorial board member for several prominent journals, including:

- IEEE Transactions on Knowledge and Data Engineering
- IEEE Transactions on Visualization and Computer Graphics
- Journal of Knowledge and Data Engineering
- ACM Transactions on Data Science
- The Visual Computer
- Information Visualization

== Literatur ==
- Daniel A. Keim (2001). Visual exploration of large data sets. Communications of the ACM, 44(8), p. 38-44.
- Daniel A. Keim (2002). Information visualization and visual data mining. in IEEE Transactions on Visualization and Computer Graphics, vol. 8, no. 1, pp. 1-8, 2002, doi: doi:10.1109/2945.981847.
- Daniel A Keim, Florian Mansmann, Jörn Schneidewind, Jim Thomas, Hartmut Ziegler (2008): Visual analytics: Scope and challenges. Visual Data Mining
- Ward, Matthew O.; Grinstein, Georges; Keim, Daniel A. (2021). Interactive Data Visualization: Foundations, Techniques, and Applications. CRC Press. ISBN 9780367783488.
- See Publications at Google Scholar.
