= Min Chen =

Min Chen may refer to:

- Min Chen (biologist), biologist at the University of Sydney
- Min Chen (computer scientist) (born 1980), professor at Huazhong University of Science and Technology
- Min Chen (murderer) (born 1983), Chinese visa student convicted of second-degree murder in the case of the death of Cecilia Zhang
- Chen Min, rebel of the Jin dynasty.
