= Cindy Bruckner-Lea =

Cynthia J. Bruckner-Lea is an American scientist. She is a program manager at Pacific Northwest National Laboratory. In 2008, she was named a fellow of the American Association for the Advancement of Science.

== Education ==
She graduated from University of California, Davis, and the University of Utah.

== Works ==
- Straub, Timothy M.; Bentrup, Kerstin Höner zu; Orosz-Coghlan, Patricia; Dohnalkova, Alice; Mayer, Brooke K.; Bartholomew, Rachel A.; Valdez, Catherine O.; Bruckner-Lea, Cynthia J.; Gerba, Charles P.; Abbaszadegan, Morteza A.; Nickerson, Cheryl A.; Chan, Martin C. W.; Wong, Y. P.; Leung, Wai K. (July 2007). "Cell Culture Assay for Human Noroviruses". Emerging Infectious Diseases journal - CDC. 13 (7). doi:10.3201/eid1307.070131.
