= XEE =

XEE may refer to:

- XML external entity attack, a web security exploit
- Xee, a Danish television station, since rebranded as See
- XEE-AM, a Mexican radio station
- XEE (Starlight), a data processing language
- A version of Evangelism Explosion designed for younger people
- Xee³, an image viewer for Mac OS X platform
