= Charles D. Hansen =

American computer scientist

- Born: October 11, 1954 (age 71)
- Citizenship: American
- Education: Memphis State University; University of Utah
- Known for: Co-editor of The Visualization Handbook Fluorender Open Space
- Spouse: Terri Case
- Children: Ri Hansen
- Awards: IEEE Visualization Technical Achievement Award (2005); IEEE Fellow (2012)
- Scientific career
- Fields: Computer Science, Graphics, Scientific visualization
- Workplaces: Los Alamos National Laboratory; INRIA; University of Utah; Scientific Computing and Imaging Institute
- Thesis: CAGD-based Computer Vision (1987)
- Doctoral advisor: Thomas C. Henderson

Dr. Charles "Chuck" D. Hansen was an American computer scientist at the University of Utah who worked on scientific visualization. He is a Distinguished Professor, a Fellow of the IEEE and a founding faculty member (Associate Director) of the Scientific Computing and Imaging Institute. He was the lead in the creation of both Fluorender and Open Space. He was an associate editor-in-chief of IEEE Transactions on Visualization and Graphics. He was on the IEEE Computer Society Board of Governors from 2022-2024 and was IEEE VP publications 2025-2026. In 2016, he stopped teaching and only did research for the University of Utah. As of 2026, he is now retired.

== Biography ==
Hansen received a BS in computer science from Memphis State University in 1981 and a PhD in computer science from the University of Utah in 1987. From 1989 to 1997, he was a Technical Staff Member in the Advanced Computing Laboratory (ACL) at Los Alamos National Laboratory, where he formed and directed the visualization efforts. He was a Bourse de Chateaubriand PostDoc Fellow at INRIA in Rocquencourt, France in 1987 and 1988. Since 1998, he has been a full professor in Computer Science at the University of Utah. In 2019, he was named a Distinguished Professor of Computing at the University of Utah. He was a visiting scientist at INRIA-Rhône-Alpes in the GRAVIR group in 2004-2005 and a visiting professor at the Joseph Fourier University in Grenoble in 2011-2012. In 2005, he won the IEEE Visualization Technical Achievement Award for his "seminal work on tools for understanding large-scale scientific data sets". In 2017, he was awarded the IEEE Technical Committee on Visualization and Graphics "Career Award" in recognition for his contributions to large scale data visualization, including advances in parallel and volume rendering, novel interaction techniques, and techniques for exploiting hardware; for his leadership in the community as an educator, program chair, and editor; and for providing vision for the development and support of the field. He was associate editor-in-chief of IEEE Transactions on Visualization and Graphics from 2003 to 2007, and again from 2014 to 2018. He was elected an IEEE Fellow in 2012. He was on the IEEE Computer Society Board of Governors from 2022-2024 and was IEEE VP publications 2025-2026. In 2016, he stopped teaching and only did research for the University of Utah.

== Books ==
- Hansen, Charles D.; Johnson, Christopher R., eds. (2005). The Visualization Handbook. Elsevier. ISBN 978-0-12-387582-2.
- Bethel, E. Wes; Childs, Hank; Hansen, Charles, eds. (2013). High Performance Visualization: Enabling Extreme-Scale Scientific Insight. Boca Raton: CRC Press. ISBN 9781439875728.
- Hansen, Charles; Chen, Min; Johnson, Christopher; Kaufman, Arie; Hagen, Hans, eds. (2014). Scientific Visualization: Uncertainty, Multifield, Biomedical, and Scalable Visualization. Springer-Verlag. ISBN 978-1-4471-6497-5.
