= Valerio Pascucci =

Italian computer scientist

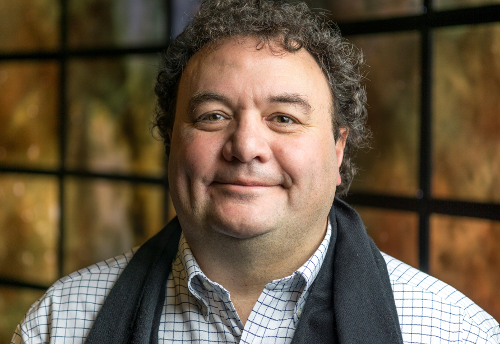
- Born: May 13, 1967 (age 59)
- Citizenship: Italian and American
- Education: Purdue University; "La Sapienza" University of Rome
- Known for: Founding director of the Center for Extreme Data Management Analysis and Visualization; Co-editor of three books on Topological Methods in Data Analysis and Visualization
- Awards: Distinguished Research Award (DRA), University of Utah (2022-2023); IEEE VGTC Visualization Technical Achievement Award (2022); Member of the IEEE VGTC Visualization Academy (2022); IEEE Visualization 14 Year Test of Time Award (2022); IEEE Visualization 15 Year Test of Time Award (2017); Distinguished Mentor Award, University of Utah (2016); DOE National Laboratory Fellow (PNNL) (2011)
- Scientific career
- Fields: Scientific Visualization; Computational Topology; High Performance Computing
- Workplaces: University of Utah
- Thesis: Multi-dimensional and multi-resolution geometric data-structures for scientific visualization (2000)
- Academic advisors: Chandrajit Bajaj; Alberto Paoluzzi

Valerio Pascucci (born May 13, 1967 in Rome, Italy) is an Italian computer scientist. He is the John R. Parks Inaugural Endowed Chair of the University of Utah, and the Founding Director of the Center for Extreme Data Management Analysis and Visualization (CEDMAV). Valerio is a faculty of the Scientific Computing and Imaging Institute (SCI), a Professor of Computer Science of the Kahlert School of Computing of the University of Utah, and was named Laboratory Fellow at PNNL and is a member of the Experimental Therapeutics Program Huntsman Cancer Institute. His research interests are in the areas of Artificial intelligence, Scientific Visualization, High Performance Computing, large scale scientific data management, and Computational Topology.

== Biography ==
Valerio received his MS in electrical engineering in 1993 from the Sapienza University of Rome, and his Ph.D. in computer science in 2000 from Purdue University.

From 2000–2008, Valerio was a computer scientist, project leader, and data analysis group leader of the Center for Applied Scientific Computing at Lawrence Livermore National Laboratory. From 2005–2008, Valerio was an adjunct professor of computer science at the University of California Davis. In 2008, Valerio joined the University of Utah, as an associate professor of computer science. In 2011 he was promoted to the rank of professor of the University of Utah School of Computing and founded the Center for Extreme Data Management Analysis and Visualization. In 2011, Valerio was named DOE Laboratory Fellow at the Pacific Northwest National Laboratory.

In 2020 Valerio was general chair of the IEEE Conference on Visualization, the world premier forum for advances in visualization and visual analytics.

Outside of his academic activities, Valerio is the founder and chair of the board of the Data Intensive Science Foundation, a non-profit established in 2019, devoted to promoting advanced technologies for science and engineering while providing outreach and training support for the betterment of society. Valerio is also the founding president of ViSOAR L.L.C., a spinoff of the University of Utah established in 2011.

== Selected publications ==
=== Books ===
- Pascucci, Valerio; Tricoche, Xavier; Hagen, Hans; Tierny, Julien (2011). Topological Methods in Data Analysis and Visualization: Theory, Algorithms, and Applications. Mathematics and Visualization. Springer. ISBN 978-3-642-15013-5.
- Bremer, Peer-Timo; Hotz, Ingrid; Pascucci, Valerio; Peikert, Ronald (2014). Topological Methods in Data Analysis and Visualization III: Theory, Algorithms, and Applications. Mathematics and Visualization. Springer. ISBN 978-3-319-04098-1.
- Bennett, Janine; Vivodtzev, Fabien; Pascucci, Valerio; Peikert, Ronald (2015). Topological and Statistical Methods for Complex Data: Tackling Large-Scale, High-Dimensional, and Multivariate Data Spaces. Mathematics and Visualization. Springer. ISBN 978-3-662-44899-1.
