= Starlight Information Visualization System =

Starlight is a software product originally developed at Pacific Northwest National Laboratory and now by Future Point Systems. It is an advanced visual analysis environment. In addition to using information visualization to show the importance of individual pieces of data by showing how they relate to one another, it also contains a small suite of tools useful for collaboration and data sharing, as well as data conversion, processing, augmentation and loading.

The software, originally developed for the intelligence community, allows users to load data from XML files, databases, RSS feeds, web services, HTML files, Microsoft Word, PowerPoint, Excel, CSV, Adobe PDF, TXT files, etc. and analyze it with a variety of visualizations and tools. The system integrates structured, unstructured, geospatial, and multimedia data, offering comparisons of information at multiple levels of abstraction, simultaneously and in near real-time. In addition Starlight allows users to build their own named entity-extractors using a combination of algorithms, targeted normalization lists and regular expressions in the Starlight Data Engineer (SDE).

As an example, Starlight might be used to look for correlations in a database containing records about chemical spills. An analyst could begin by grouping records according to the cause of the spill to reveal general trends. Sorting the data a second time, they could apply different colors based on related details such as the company responsible, age of equipment or geographic location. Maps and photographs could be integrated into the display, making it even easier to recognize connections among multiple variables.

Starlight has been deployed to both the Iraq and Afghanistan wars and used on a number of large-scale projects.

PNNL began developing Starlight in the mid-1990s, with funding from the Land Information Warfare Agency, a part of the Army Intelligence and Security Command and continued developed at the laboratory with funding from the NSA and the CIA. Starlight integrates visual representations of reports, radio transcripts, radar signals, maps and other information. The software system was recently honored with an R&D 100 Award for technical innovation.

In 2006 Future Point Systems, a Silicon Valley startup, acquired rights to jointly develop and distribute the Starlight product in cooperation with the Pacific Northwest National Laboratory.

The software is now also used outside of the military/intelligence communities in a number of commercial environments.
