= Jack van Wijk =

Dutch computer scientist

Jarke J. (Jack) van Wijk (born 1959) is a Dutch computer scientist, a professor in the Department of Mathematics and Computer Science at the Eindhoven University of Technology, and an expert in information visualization.

== Biography ==
Van Wijk received his M.S. from the Delft University of Technology in 1982. His master's thesis, on simulation of traffic collisions, led him to become interested in computer visualization, and he remained at Delft for his doctoral studies, completing a Ph.D. in 1986 under the supervision of Dennis J. McConalogue. He worked at the Energy Research Centre of the Netherlands from 1988 until 1998, when he joined the Eindhoven faculty; he was promoted to a full professorship in 2001.

As well as being a faculty member at TU Eindhoven, van Wijk is the vice president for scientific affairs at MagnaView, a Dutch information visualization company.

== Research ==
A video inspired by van Wijk's work on myriahedral projection

In information visualization, Van Wijk is known for his research in texture synthesis, treemaps, and flow visualization. His work on map projection won the 2009 Henry Johns Award of the British Cartographic Society for best cartographic journal article. He has twice been program co-chair for IEEE Visualization, and once for IEEE InfoVis. In 2007, he received an IEEE Technical Achievement Award for his visualization research.

In graph drawing, van Wijk has worked on the visualization of small-world networks and on the depiction of abstract trees as biological trees. He has also conducted user studies that showed that the standard depiction of directed edges in graph drawings using arrowheads is less effective at conveying the directionality of the edges to readers than other conventions such as tapering. He was one of two invited speakers at the 19th International Symposium on Graph Drawing in 2011, and the capstone speaker at the IEEE Visualization 2013.
