= Geographic analytics =

Geographic analytics is an analytical approach to strategic management and data analytics to make geographic decisions efficiently. Examples of such decisions are choosing the location for a warehouse or planning the regions for a marketing campaign. Data, information and framing conditions are visualized on maps to derive recommendations for action.

In comparison to geographic information systems (GIS), which primarily aim at the representation of information on maps (descriptive analytics), Geographic analytics additionally focuses on making business decisions based on the data visualization on the map (prescriptive analytics).

== Background ==
Purely mathematically based approaches that are used in data analytics in order to support management decisions often have the disadvantage that they require a large amount of data. This often results in considerable efforts for gathering, cleaning and understanding the data. Furthermore, there can be “intangible” framing conditions that are disruptive to any purely data-driven optimization solution.

Example logistics: For the task to find the optimal location for a warehouse in a logistics network, so-called Center of Gravity models are being used. To minimize the cost, these models use transport volume data, customer locations, cost data, etc., in order to determine the optimal location. However, there are often framing conditions – for example, traffic infrastructure, borders, regulatory and even physical hurdles – which are difficult to be mathematically described and modelled.

In practice, such framing conditions are often only recognized at the end of the data-driven analysis. The framing conditions then have to be included into the model, which has to be recalculated. As a worst case, the approach to the problem has to be done from scratch. This results in delays of the decision-making process and often goes along with significant additional efforts.

== Application and objective ==
Geographic analytics starts with the visualization of basic data on a map. By involving experts from the field, the visualization is then being used in order to determine framing conditions and focal points of the business problem.

As a result, the solution space, i.e. the number of possible solutions of the data analysis, is being reduced. In addition, framing conditions as well as data errors are being recognized in this early stage of the analysis. Only then, traditional data analytics methods are coming into play to find the optimal solution to the problem.

With this approach, lesser data is required for the overall analysis and time and effort for the analysis is being significantly reduced. Impracticable and flawed solutions are being identified and excluded upfront.

== Areas of application ==
Geographic analytics is being used in connection with data analyses in order to support management decisions that contain a geographical component, such as location decisions, marketing campaigns, service center placements, etc.

=== Example Industries ===
- Logistics / Supply chain management
  - Example: Planning the location of a distribution center to minimize logistics costs when distributing products to customers.
- Retail trade
  - Example: Opening of a new shop at a strategically favorable location for commuters
- Oil and gas Industry
  - Example: Planning the locations of test wells in order to develop a new oil field at the lowest possible cost.

=== Example business areas ===
- Marketing
  - Example: Development of a regional marketing campaign for a new product
- Infrastructure
  - Example: Traffic planning / planning of traffic expansions in a large city to reduce congestion times
- Services
  - Example: Planning the placement of ATMs in order to achieve the highest possible degree of coverage in a region
- Agriculture
- Banking
- Community Development & Planning
- Disaster Management
- Mapping & Navigation
- Military
- Public Health
- Risk Assessment
- Telecommunications Services

== Etymology ==
The term and the methodology of geographic analytics were first described in 2013 by Jozo Acksteiner and Claudia Trautmann in the Supply Chain Management Review.
