= Edward J. Delp =

Electrical engineer

- Born: Edward John Delp III; Cincinnati, Ohio
- Education: Purdue University; University of Cincinnati
- Known for: Block Truncation Coding; Video Compression; Image Processing; Media Forensics
- Scientific career
- Fields: Electrical Engineering
- Workplaces: Purdue University; University of Michigan
- Thesis: Moment Preserving Quantization and Its Application to Block Truncation Coding (1979)
- Doctoral advisor: O. Robert Mitchell

Edward John Delp III is an American electrical engineer and academic who is the Charles William Harrison Distinguished Professor of Electrical and Computer Engineering and Professor of Biomedical Engineering at Purdue University. Delp's research has focused on image processing, video compression, medical imaging, digital watermarking, and multimedia security and forensics.

Delp is a Fellow of the Institute of Electrical and Electronics Engineers (IEEE), the Society for Imaging Science and Technology (IS&T), SPIE, the American Institute for Medical and Biological Engineering, the National Academy of Inventors, the Association for Computing Machinery (ACM), and the American Association for the Advancement of Science (AAAS).

== Early life and education ==
Delp was born in Cincinnati, Ohio. He received a Bachelor of Science in Electrical Engineering from the University of Cincinnati in 1973 and a Master of Science in Electrical Engineering from the same university in 1975. He later pursued doctoral studies at Purdue University, earning a Ph.D. in electrical engineering in 1979. His dissertation, Moment Preserving Quantization and Its Application in Block Truncation Coding, was supervised by Owen Robert Mitchell Jr.

In 2002, Tampere University of Technology in Finland awarded Delp an honorary Doctor of Technology degree.

== Academic career ==
From 1980 to 1984, Delp was a faculty member in the Department of Electrical and Computer Engineering at the University of Michigan. In 1984, he joined Purdue University as a faculty member in the School of Electrical and Computer Engineering.

From 2002 to 2008, Delp held the title of Silicon Valley Professor of Electrical and Computer Engineering and Professor of Biomedical Engineering at Purdue. In 2008, he was appointed the Charles William Harrison Distinguished Professor of Electrical and Computer Engineering at Purdue University, while continuing his appointment as professor of biomedical engineering. He is the director of the Video and Image Processing Laboratory (VIPER) at Purdue University.

== Research ==
Delp's research has focused on image processing, video processing, computer vision, signal processing, and multimedia security. His early work examined image-compression methods, including block truncation coding and autoregressive models for digital-image representation. He has also worked on computer-assisted medical-image analysis, including applications in echocardiography and mammography.

His research on image and video compression has addressed rate-scalable coding, low-complexity coding, error-resilient video transmission, and motion estimation. He has also investigated the use of networked and mobile systems for image-based applications, as well as content-based video analysis, video indexing, and image retrieval.

Another area of Delp's research is multimedia security and digital forensics. His work in this field has included digital watermarking, data hiding, image authentication, and the forensic identification of printers, scanners, and imaging sensors. Related studies have addressed document security and methods for detecting manipulated digital media.

His subsequent research in media forensics has examined the integrity of scientific images, the detection of manipulated satellite imagery, and the identification of deepfake and other generated media.

Delp has also applied computer-vision and machine learning methods to interdisciplinary research. These applications have included mobile dietary assessment, remote health measurements, fluorescence-microscopy image analysis, public-safety video analysis, and person re-identification. His agricultural applications have included image-based plant phenotyping and precision agriculture, while his later work has also considered speech forensics.

== Honors and awards ==
- 1997 – Fellow of the Institute of Electrical and Electronics Engineers (IEEE)
- 1998 – Fellow of the Society for Imaging Science and Technology (IS&T)
- 1998 – Elected Fellow of SPIE
- 2001 – Raymond C. Bowman Award, Society for Imaging Science and Technology
- 2003 – Elected Fellow of the American Institute for Medical and Biological Engineering
- 2004 – Wilfred Hesselberth Award for Teaching Excellence, Purdue University
- 2004 – Claude Shannon–Harry Nyquist Technical Achievement Award, IEEE Signal Processing Society
- 2008 – Norbert Wiener Society Award, IEEE Signal Processing Society
- 2011 – U.S. Army Research Laboratory Director's Coin
- 2014 – Morrill Award, Purdue University
- 2015 – Named Scientist of the Year by IS&T and SPIE
- 2017 – Aden and Marjorie Meinel Technology Achievement Award, SPIE
- 2017 – Honorary Membership, Society for Imaging Science and Technology
- 2019 – Inducted into the Purdue Book of Great Teachers
- 2024 – Fellow of the National Academy of Inventors
- 2024 – Fellow of the Association for Computing Machinery (ACM)
- 2025 – Fellow of the American Association for the Advancement of Science (FAAAS)

== Books ==
- Buda, A. J., and Delp, E. J. (eds.). Digital Cardiac Imaging. Martinus Nijhoff, The Hague, 1985.
- Delp, E. J. (ed.). Nonlinear Image Processing, Proceedings of the SPIE Conference on Nonlinear Image Processing, Vol. 1247, Santa Clara, California, 1990.
