= Eduard Gröller =

Austrian computer scientist

Eduard Gröller (January 28, 1962 in Güssing) is an Austrian computer scientist and professor at the Technische Universität Wien.

== Life ==
Dr. Gröller received his PhD from the Vienna University of Technology in 1993. Since 1994 he has been working at the research area Computer Graphics (Institute for Visual Computing & Human-Centered Technology), which he also heads since 2019. He has lectured on visualization at several other universities (Tübingen, Graz, Prague, Bahia Blanca, Magdeburg, Bergen). He was a scientific proponent and is currently a key researcher at the VRVis Research Center

Between 2005 and 2026, Gröller has been an adjunct professor of Computer Science in the Visgroup of the University of Bergen, Norway. He has co-authored many publications and has served as a reviewer for numerous conferences and journals in the field. He has also served on various program committees like Computers&Graphics, IEEE Transactions on Visualization and Graphics, EuroVis Conference, IEEE Visualization Conference, Eurographics Conference. He was co-chair of Volume Graphics 2005, IEEE Visualization 2005 and 2006, and Eurographics 2006. He was co-chair of VisSym Symposium 1999, Eurographics 2011 Conference, and EuroVis 2012 Conference. Dr. Gröller was editor-in-chief of the Computer Graphics Forum Journal during 2008-2011

In recent years, Dr. Gröller has worked in the areas of comparative medical visualization, multiscale visualization, biomolecular visual analysis, nanostructure visualization, visual analysis of parameter spaces, visual data science, and guided navigation. Dr. Gröller has published widely in the visualization field with, for example, more than 50 articles in the IEEE Transactions on Visualization and Computer Graphics Journal and more than 30 articles in the Computer Graphics Forum Journal.

== Awards ==
- Promotio Sub Auspiciis Praesidentis Rei Publicae, for passing doctoral studies with highest distinction. Recipient of the Appreciation Award of the Federal Minister for Science and Research (1993).
- Fellow of the Eurographics association (2009)
- Eurographics Outstanding Technical Contributions Award (2015)
- IEEE VGTC Visualization Technical Achievement Award and induction into the IEEE VGTC VIS Academy (2019)
- IEEE VGTC Visualization Lifetime Achievement Award (2025)
