= Arie E. Kaufman =

Israeli-American computer scientist (born 1954)

Arie Kaufman
- Born: 1954 (age 71–72)
- Education: Hebrew University (undergraduate); Ben-Gurion University of the Negev (postgraduate)
- Scientific career
- Fields: Computer Science; Visualization; Computer graphics
- Workplaces: Ben-Gurion University of the Negev; Stony Brook University
- Thesis: An Interactive Real-Time Graphic Language
- Doctoral advisor: Samuel Bergman
- Doctoral students: Hanspeter Pfister; Claudio Silva; Huamin Qu

Arie E. Kaufman (born 1954) is an Israeli-American computer scientist best known for his work in volume visualization and virtual reality. Dr. Kaufman is Distinguished Professor and Chair of the Department of Computer Science at Stony Brook University, where he is also Director of the Center for Visual Computing (CVC), and Chief Scientist at the Center of Excellence in Wireless and Information Technology (CEWIT). He has an H-Index of 84 and is currently the ninth most cited researcher in the world working in the area of visualization.

== Education ==
Born in Jerusalem, Israel, Kaufman attended Hebrew University as an undergraduate, graduating in 1969 with BSc degrees in physics and mathematics. He later received his PhD in Computer Science at Ben-Gurion University of the Negev in 1977, supervised by Samuel Bergman.

== Academic work ==
Within the field of computer science, Kaufman is known for his work in visualization, graphics, virtual reality, user interfaces, multimedia, and their applications, especially in bio-medicine. He is especially well known for his work on the 3-dimensional virtual colonoscopy, a revolutionary low-risk technique for colon cancer screening, and for pioneering the use of Graphics Processing Units (GPUs) and GPU-clusters. In 2012, he presided over the development and opening of the Reality Deck, the largest virtual reality display in the world, at Stony Brook University.

Kaufman was the founding Editor in Chief of IEEE Transactions on Visualization and Computer Graphics (TVCG), co-founded the IEEE Visualization Conference and Volume Graphics series, and is currently the director of IEEE Computer Society Technical Committee on Visualization and Graphics. He is an IEEE Fellow, ACM Fellow, winner of many awards, including the IEEE Visualization Career Award, and member of the European Academy of Sciences.
