= Environmental Molecular Sciences Laboratory =

US research facility

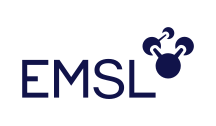

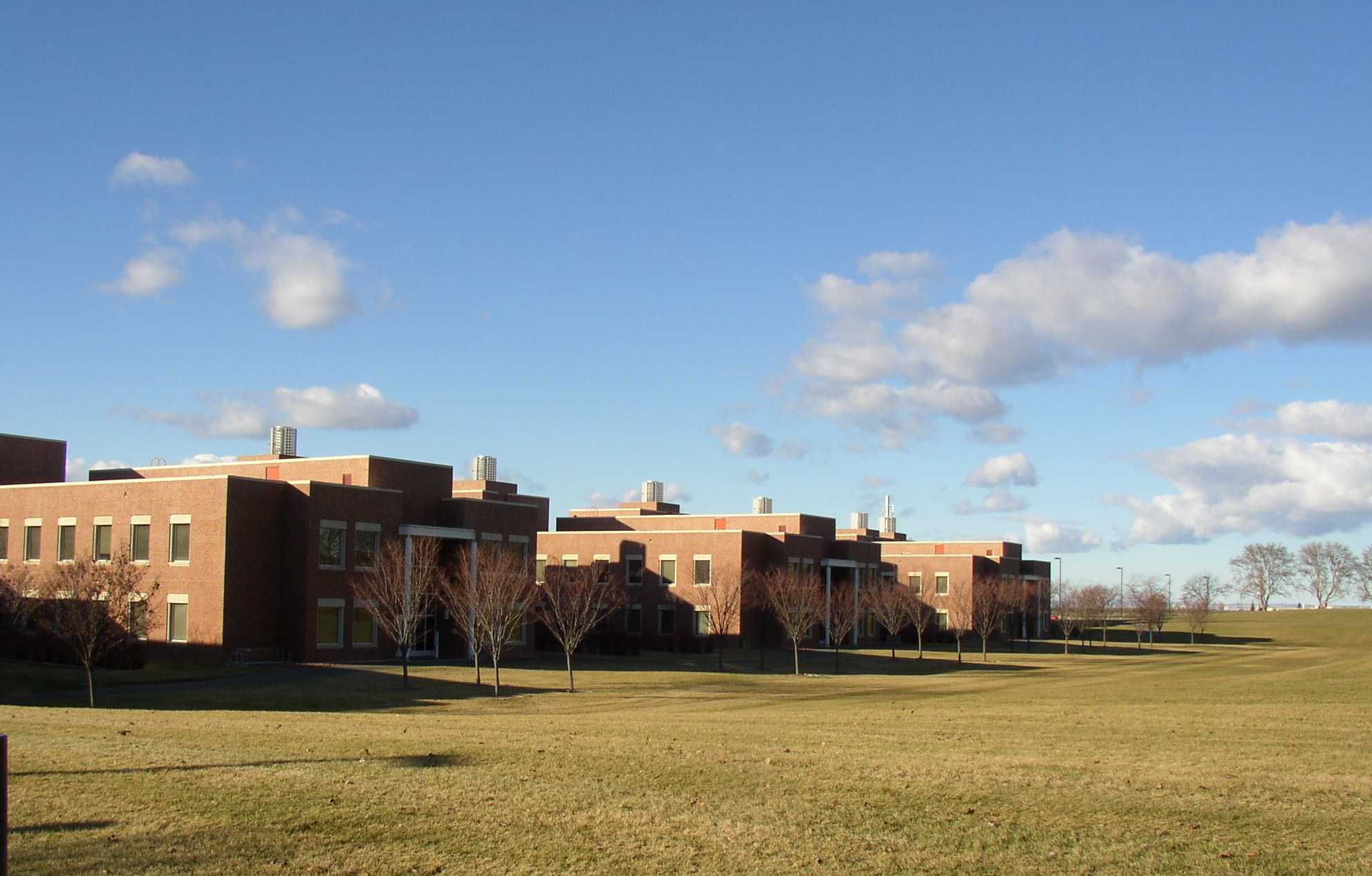
- Established: October 1, 1997
- Field of research: Biological, environmental, and computational sciences
- Director: Justin Teeguarden
- Staff: 150
- Users: 500 annually
- Patents: 100 plus
- Instruments: 150 plus
- Size: 234,000 square feet
- Publications: 400 per year
- Location: Pacific Northwest National Laboratory; Richland, Washington, U.S. 46°20′55″N 119°16′42″W
- Website: www.emsl.pnnl.gov

The Environmental Molecular Sciences Laboratory (EMSL, pronounced em-zul) is a U.S. Department of Energy Office of Science user facility located on the campus of Pacific Northwest National Laboratory in Richland, Washington.

== Research ==
EMSL scientists and collaborators perform fundamental research that focuses on the biological, biogeochemical, and physical principles to predict processes occurring at the molecular and genomics-controlled smallest scales to the environmental Earth system changes at the largest scales.

The Functional and Systems Biology Science Area focuses on understanding enzymes and biochemical pathways that connect protein structures and functions to phenotypic responses and interactions within cells, among cells in communities, and between cellular membrane surfaces and their environment for microbes and plants.

The Environmental Transformations and Interactions Science Area focuses on the mechanistic and predictive understanding of the environmental (physiochemical, hydrological, biogeochemical), microbial, plant, and ecological processes in above and belowground ecosystems, the atmosphere, and their interfaces.

The Computing, Analytics, and Modeling Science Area focuses on using state-of-the-art experimental data to develop a predictive understanding of biological and environmental systems through advanced data analytics, visualization, and computational modeling and simulation.

EMSL uses integrated research platforms to uncover critical information for understanding and predicting the molecular functions of biological and ecosystem processes.

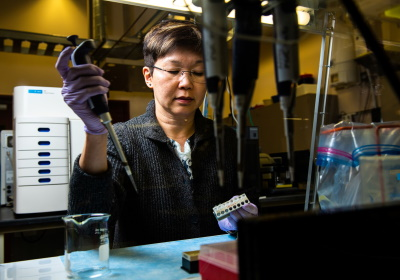
A biologist is preparing an RNA sample to understand how brown rot fungi degrades wood.

Biogeochemical Transformations investigates how molecular interactions at the Earth's land, water, and air interfaces transform and transport nutrients and contaminants within the environment.

Biomolecular Pathways investigates the translation of genomic information into functional relationships among biomolecules within cells in response to changes in their internal or external environment.

Cell Signaling and Communications reveals dynamic interactions and trafficking of molecular signals within and between cells, populations, and communities to understand complex inter-relationships between organisms in response to their environment.

Terrestrial-Atmospheric Processes investigates molecular transformations, physical processes that control them, and the coupling of terrestrial and atmospheric processes.

Rhizosphere Function investigates interactions between genes and the environment at the molecular level to understand, predict and control plant and ecosystem traits at the systems scale.

Structural Biology gains structural, biochemical, and dynamic information about proteins, protein complexes, and other biomolecules at nanoscale spatial and temporal resolutions to understand function.

Systems Modeling uses computational models of protein structure and function, metabolic modeling, and machine learning approaches to associate genotype with phenotype and to understand biological processes that control nutrient flux, and enable predictive approaches to biodesign and biofuel/bioproduct production.

== Operations ==
EMSL is a user research facility whereby scientists, from around the world, can submit project proposals to access the laboratory's experts and equipment at no cost. Proposals are screened through a competitive peer-review process to ensure the project is scientifically impactful and relevant to DOE's Office of Biological and Environmental Research mission.

Scientists whose proposals are accepted are referred to as EMSL users. Typical user research projects can last a few months to a few years. EMSL users do not have to stay on-site for the duration of their project and can visit the laboratory when needed. Much of the sample processing and analysis can be handled remotely.

EMSL's user community provides the laboratory's management team with recommendations for scientific direction and efficient operations through an elected committee of representatives.

== History ==
=== 1986–1997 ===
The idea that would become EMSL began in 1985 with a National Academy of Sciences report titled Opportunities in Chemistry. The report identified scientific challenges relating to energy and the environment that required fundamental research to achieve a solution.

In response, then director of PNNL, William R. Wiley, and lab senior managers proposed a center for molecular science that would bring together researchers from the physical and life sciences and theoreticians with experience in computing and molecular process modeling. Wiley envisioned a facility with advanced instrumentation for the study of molecular-level chemistry in an integrated and collaborative manner.

Ohio-based Battelle Memorial Institute, which operates PNNL for DOE, approved $8.5 million in funding over four years to build the facility; develop research programs; and obtain the equipment, facilities, scientists, and support staff.

Construction began in July 1994 and was completed in August 1997. EMSL opened October 1, 1997 for full operation.

=== 1997–2001 ===
During its first five years, EMSL leaders built capabilities, recruited scientific leadership, and attracted users. The leaders then expanded the scientific focus to include biology, particularly the study of naturally occurring microbes for environmental cleanup, alternative energy, and carbon dioxide reduction in the atmosphere.

EMSL's early user program focused on single investigator studies that crossed scientific areas and quickly reached more than 1,000 users per year, representing every state and several foreign countries.

=== 2001–2009 ===
During this period, EMSL focused on two Grand Challenges: a biogeochemistry question concerning the fundamental interaction between microbes and minerals, and a study addressing the structure and function of proteins in the cell membrane. Work on these challenges led to new opportunities for the scientific community, with research campaigns designed to focus teams on a single challenge.

In January 2007, EMSL celebrated its first permanent expansion: a nearly 4,000-square-foot raised floor for an 11.8-teraflop computer named Chinook, which was then the fifth-fastest system in the world. In April 2008, EMSL dedicated a new office pod to distinguished user J. Mike White that houses nearly 100 staff and users PNNL. In early 2012, EMSL opened its Quiet Wing housing a suite of ultrasensitive high-resolution microscopy and scanning instruments.

=== 2009 to present ===
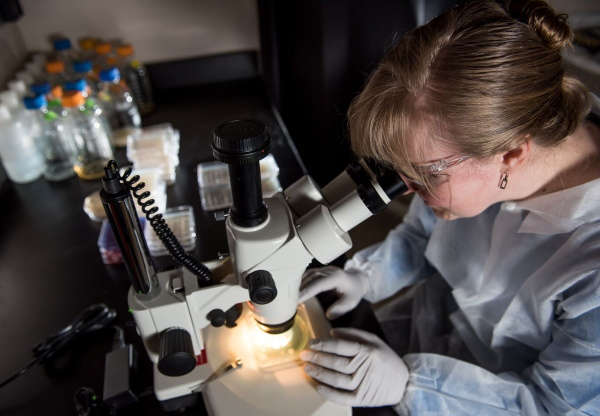
A biologist is studying natural bioproducts using traditional genetics and synthetic biology.

In October 2010, EMSL's premier computational chemistry software package, NWChem went open source, allowing computer scientists worldwide to contribute to its future development and making it available to more researchers and students. The code has been cited over 3760 times since 2010, according to a Web of Science search in March 2020.

In June 2013, EMSL retired the Chinook computer and welcomed Cascade, a 3.4-petaflops system.

EMSL celebrated its twentieth anniversary in August 2017, showcasing NWChem computational chemistry software, and advances in subsurface science and foundational biofuel production. Scientific leaders participated in the event, including internationally recognized scientists Thom Dunning, Steve Colson, and Jean Futrell.

Today, EMSL focuses its scientific research in Functional and Systems Biology, Environmental Transformations and Interactions, and Computing, Analytics, and Modeling together with users from diverse scientific communities. This science is a part of driving technology development and computational capabilities.

== EMSL directors ==
- Thom Dunning — led construction activities, 1994–1997
- Teresa Fryberger — interim director, 1997–1998
- Jean Futrell — 1999–2002
- J.W. Rogers, Jr. — 2002–2004
- Allison A. Campbell — interim 2004–2005, 2005–2015
- Harvey Bolton — interim 2015–2016, interim 2017–2019
- Liyuan Liang — 2016–2017
- Douglas Mans — 2019–2025
- Justin Teeguarden — interim 2025-present
