= Hanspeter Pfister =

Swiss computer scientist

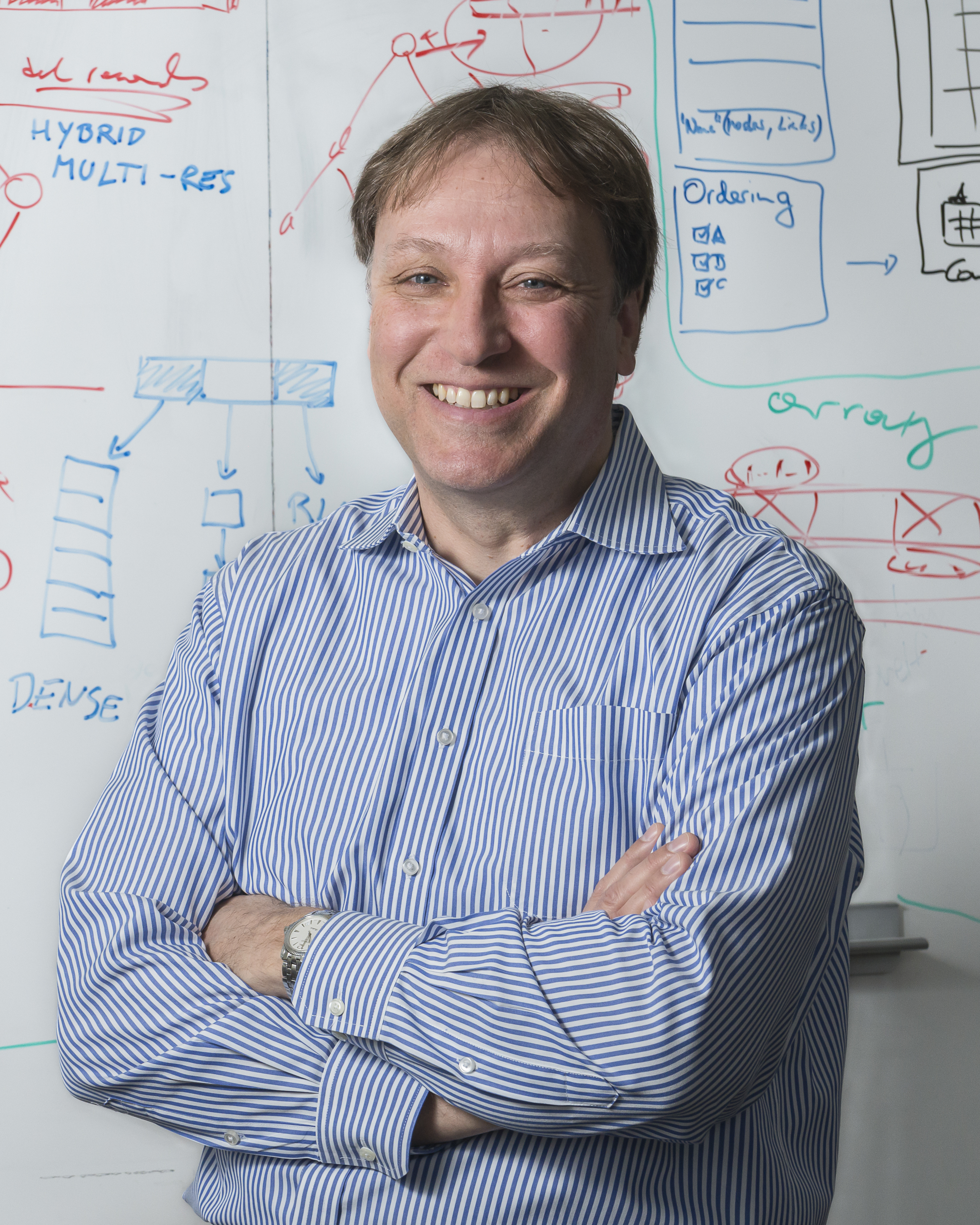
- Born: April 3, 1964 (age 62)
- Education: ETH Zurich; Stony Brook University
- Known for: VolumePro
- Awards: Mitsubishi Electric President's Award (2000); IEEE Visualization Technical Achievement Award (2010); IEEE Visualization Academy Fellow (2019); ACM Fellow (2019); IEEE Fellow (2023)
- Scientific career
- Fields: Computer graphics, Computer vision, Scientific visualization, Information visualization
- Workplaces: Harvard University
- Thesis: Cube-4: A Scalable Architecture for Real-Time Volume Rendering (1996)
- Doctoral advisor: Arie Kaufman
- Website: https://vcg.seas.harvard.edu

Hanspeter Pfister is a Swiss computer scientist. He is the An Wang Professor of Computer Science at the Harvard John A. Paulson School of Engineering and Applied Sciences and an affiliate faculty member of the Center for Brain Science at Harvard University. His research in visual computing lies at the intersection of scientific visualization, information visualization, computer graphics, and computer vision and spans a wide range of topics, including biomedical image analysis and visualization, image and video analysis, and visual analytics in data science.

== Biography ==
Hanspeter Pfister received his master's degree in 1991 in electrical engineering at ETH Zurich and moved to the United States for his PhD in computer science at Stony Brook University. In 1992 he began working with Arie Kaufman on Cube-3, a hardware architecture for volume visualization. By the time of his graduation in 1996, he had finished the architecture for Cube-4 and licensed it to Mitsubishi Electric Research Laboratories. He joined Mitsubishi Electric Research Laboratories in 1996 as a research scientists, where he worked for over a decade. He was the chief architect of VolumePro, Mitsubishi Electric's real-time volume rendering graphics card, for which he received the Mitsubishi Electric President's Award in 2000. He joined the faculty at Harvard University in 2007. In 2012 Hanspeter Pfister was appointed the An Wang Professor of Computer Science and started his research lab called the Visual Computing Group. In the same year, he also served as the Technical Papers Chair at SIGGRAPH and became a consultant for Disney Research From 2013 to 2017, Hanspeter Pfister was the director of the Institute for Applied Computational Science at the Harvard John A. Paulson School of Engineering and Applied Sciences.

== Awards and prizes ==
- 2023, Elected as IEEE Fellow
- 2019, Elected as ACM Fellow
- 2019, Elected into the IEEE Visualization Academy as a recognition for his achievements in the scientific visualization and information visualization research communities.
- 2011, Dean's Thesis Prize, Harvard Extension School ALM in Information Technology, for Michael Tracey Zellman's thesis “Creating and Visualizing Congressional Districts”
- 2010, IEEE Visualization Technical Achievement Award.
- 2009, IEEE Golden Core Award.
- 2009, IEEE Meritorious Service Award.
- 2009, Petra T. Shattuck Excellence in Teaching Award.
- 2009, Dean's Thesis Prize, Harvard Extension School ALM in Information Technology, for Manish Kumar's thesis “View-Dependent FTLV”
- 2007, Dean's Thesis Prize, Harvard Extension School ALM in Information Technology, for Joseph Weber's thesis “ProteinShader: Cartoon-Type Visualization of Macromolecules Using Programmable Graphics Cards”
- 2005, Dean's Thesis Prize, Harvard Extension School ALM in Information Technology, for George P. Stathis’ thesis “Aspect-Oriented Shade Trees”
- 2002, 2003, and 2004, Distinguished Teaching Performance, Harvard Extension School
- 2000, Mitsubishi Electric President's Award.
- 1999, Innovation Awards and Top 100 Products Award for VolumePro
- 1994, The Jack Heller Award for Outstanding Contribution to the CS Department, SUNY Stony Brook
- 1992, Swiss Academy of Technical Sciences Fellowship
- 1991 and 1992, ABB Switzerland Research Fellowship
- 1991–1996, U.S. Government Fulbright Scholarship

== Most relevant publications ==
As of Dec 2019, according to Google Scholar, Hanspeter Pfister's most cited publications are:

1. Pfister, H., Zwicker, M., Van Baar, J., & Gross, M. (2000). Surfels: Surface elements as rendering primitives. In Proceedings of the 27th annual conference on Computer graphics and interactive techniques, 335–342.
2. Zwicker, M., Pfister, H., Van Baar, J., & Gross, M. (2001). Surface splatting. In Proceedings of the 28th annual conference on Computer graphics and interactive techniques, 371–378.
3. Marks, J., Andalman, B., Beardsley, P. A., Freeman, W., Gibson, S., Hodgins, J., Kang, T., Mirtich, B., Pfister, H., Ruml, W., et al. (1997). Design galleries: A general approach to setting parameters for computer graphics and animation. In Proceedings of the 24th annual conference on Computer graphics and interactive techniques, 389–400.
4. Matusik, W., & Pfister, H. (2004). 3D TV: a scalable system for real-time acquisition, transmission, and autostereoscopic display of dynamic scenes. In ACM Transactions on Graphics (TOG), 23, 3, 814–824.
5. Vlasic, D., Brand, M., Pfister, H., & Popović, J. (2005). Face transfer with multilinear models. In ACM transactions on graphics (TOG), 24, 3, 426–433.
6. Pfister, H., Hardenbergh, J., Knittel, J., Lauer, H., and Seiler, L. (1999). The VolumePro real-time ray-casting system. In Proceedings of the 26th Annual Conference on Computer Graphics and Interactive Techniques, SIGGRAPH 99, 251–260.
7. Kasthuri, N., Hayworth, K. J., Berger, D. R., Schalek, R. L., Conchello, J. e. A., Knowles-Barley, S., Lee, D., Vãzquez Reina, A., Kaynig, V., Jones, T. R., et al. (2015). Saturated reconstruction of a volume of neocortex. Cell, 162(3):648–661.
8. Lex, A., Gehlenborg, N., Strobelt, H., Vuillemot, R., & Pfister, H. (2014). UpSet: visualization of intersecting sets. IEEE transactions on visualization and computer graphics, 20(12), 1983–1992.
9. Pfister, H., Lorensen, B., Bajaj, C., Kindlmann, G., Schroeder, W., Avila, L. S., Raghu, K. M., Machiraju, R. & Lee, J. (2001). The transfer function bake-off. IEEE Computer Graphics and Applications, 21(3), 16–22.
10. Borkin, M. A., Vo, A. A., Bylinskii, Z., Isola, P., Sunkavalli, S., Oliva, A., & Pfister, H. (2013). What makes a visualization memorable?. IEEE Transactions on Visualization and Computer Graphics, 19(12), 2306–2315.

A complete list of Hanspeter Pfister's publications can be found on his research group's website.
