= International Journal of Sensor Networks =

- Discipline: Sensor networks
- Language: English

Publication details
- History: 2006–present
- Publisher: Inderscience Publishers
- Frequency: 12 issues per year

Standard abbreviations
- ISO 4: Int. J. Sens. Netw.

Indexing
- ISSN: 1748-1279 (print); 1748-1287 (web)
- LCCN: 2010210997
- OCLC no.: 746961602

Links
- Journal homepage; Online archive

The International Journal of Sensor Networks (IJSNet) is a monthly peer-reviewed scientific journal covering research on distributed, wired, and wireless sensor networks. It is published by Inderscience Publishers. The journal was established in 2006.

== Abstracting and indexing ==
The journal is abstracted and indexed in Science Citation Index Expanded, Current Contents/Engineering, Computing & Technology, Scopus, Academic OneFile, and the ACM Digital Library.
