= David S. Ebert =

American computer scientist

David S. Ebert is a computer scientist, holding the position of Silicon Valley Professor of Electrical and Computer Engineering Department at Purdue University.

Ebert's research focuses on computer graphics and visualization. Currently, he is the director of U.S. DHS Center of Excellence (COE) in Visual Analytics (VACCINE). and Center for Education and Research in Information Assurance and Security (CERIAS)

== Education ==
He received his Ph.D., master, and bachelor degrees in Computer Science from Ohio State University in 1991, 1987, 1986 respectively.

== Career ==
He joined Purdue University as an associate professor in 2000, was promoted to a full professor in 2006.

== Publications ==
- Ebert DS, Musgrave FK, Peachey D, Perlin K, Worley S. Texturing & modeling: a procedural approach. Morgan Kaufmann; 2003. Cited 1438 times according to Google Scholar
- Zhu F, Bosch M, Woo I, Kim S, Boushey CJ, Ebert DS, Delp EJ. The use of mobile devices in aiding dietary assessment and evaluation. IEEE journal of selected topics in signal processing. 2010 May 27;4(4):756-66. Cited 311 times according to Google Scholar
