= Min Chen (computer scientist) =

Chinese computer scientist

- Birth name: Chen Min (陈敏)
- Origin: Fuzhou, Jiangxi, China
- Occupation: Professor
- Years active: 2009 – present

Min Chen (陈敏) is a Chinese computer scientist and academic. He is a professor in the School of Computer Science and Technology at Huazhong University of Science and Technology (HUST). His research focuses on Big data, Internet of Things, Machine to Machine Communications, Body Area Networks, Body Sensor Networks, E-healthcare, Mobile Cloud Computing, Cloud-Assisted Mobile Computing, Ubiquitous Network and Services, Mobile Agent, and Multimedia Transmission over Wireless Network, etc. He has been an IEEE Senior Member since 2009.

== Education ==
Chen was 15 when he was accepted into a university, despite not taking an entrance exam. He graduated in four years and obtained a PhD at 23. Chen completed two postdoctoral appointments. Afterwards, Min studied Eastern philosophy, arts, dancing, Taekwondo, and poetry.

== Academic accomplishments ==
He was R&D director at Confederal Network Inc. from 2008 to 2009. He was an assistant professor in School of Computer Science and Engineering at Seoul National University (SNU) from September 2009 to February 2012. He was a Post-Doctoral Fellow at SNU for one and half years.

He worked as a Post-Doctoral Fellow in the Department of Electrical and Computer Engineering at University of British Columbia (UBC) for three years.

== Awards ==
He received Best Paper Award from IEEE ICC 2012 and Best Paper Runner-up Award from QShine 2008. In 2024, he received the Visualization Lifetime Achievement Award by VGTC for his life's work.

== Publications ==
He has more than 180 publications. He serves as editor or associate editor for Information Sciences, Wireless Communications and Mobile Computing, IET Communications, IET Networks, Wiley I. J. of Security and Communication Networks, Journal of Internet Technology, KSII Transactions on Internet and Information Systems and International Journal of Sensor Networks. He is managing editor for IJAACS and IJART. He is a Guest Editor for IEEE Networks, IEEE Wireless Communications Magazine and others.

He is Co-Chair of IEEE ICC 2012-Communications Theory Symposium and of IEEE ICC 2013-Wireless Networks Symposium. He is General Co-Chair for the 12th IEEE International Conference on Computer and Information Technology (IEEE CIT-2012). He is Keynote Speaker for CyberC 2012 and Mobiquitous 2012. He is a TPC member for IEEE INFOCOM 2014.

Some widely cited papers or books he published or co-authored include:

- Big Data
- Big Data: A Survey
- Body Area Networks: A Survey

== Dance and Taekwondo ==
His performance of "The Same Song" (同一首歌) was broadcast on China Central TV in Feb 18, 2007. On Mar. 8th, 2007, he showcased a dance and Taekwondo demonstration in the Asian Center at the University of British Columbia. He was interviewed by the Chinese Canadian Times where he appeared in the celebrity column in 2007.
