= Jim Thomas (computer scientist) =

American computer scientist

James Thomas (March 26, 1946 – August 6, 2010) was an American computer scientist in the field of visualization. He spent much of his career at the Pacific Northwest National Laboratory.

== Life ==
James Joseph Thomas was born March 26, 1946, in Spokane, Washington. He majored in mathematics at Eastern Washington University, and received a master's degree from Washington State University in computer science.

His professional career started at General Motors, where he worked in the area of computer-aided graphics and design soon after graduate school in early 1970s. He later returned to his home state to join the Pacific Northwest Laboratory (later renamed Pacific Northwest National Laboratory) as a computer scientist in 1976. He rose through the ranks from senior scientist, staff scientist, chief scientist, to laboratory fellow.

In the 1980s, he was a member of the founding team who conceptualized and developed the core concepts for what is today’s William R. Wiley Environmental and Molecular Sciences Laboratory, a DOE scientific user facility located at PNNL. In the early 1990s, to address the problem of information overload, Thomas headed a team of information technology researchers to develop the SPIRE document Visualization (computer graphics) visualization and analytics system. As of 2019, the successor to this system, IN-SPIRE, is still in use. In the early 2000s, Thomas led and coordinated a team to formally define a new research area, visual analytics. The U.S. Department of Homeland Security (DHS) established the National Visualization and Analytics Center (NVAC) at PNNL in 2004, naming Thomas as its founding director. On July 31, 2009, Thomas retired from his position at PNNL after 33 years. He died on August 6, 2010.

== Professional Societies ==
Thomas organized the SIGGRAPH conference in 1987, founded and organized the first ACM Symposium on User Interface Software and Technology (UIST) gathering in 1989, chaired ACM SIGGRAPH from 1989 to 1992, served as editor-in-chief of IEEE Computer Graphics and Applications from 2002 to 2006.

He chaired the IEEE Visualization conference in 2003. He helped found the IEEE Visual Analytics Science and Technology (VAST) Symposium that began in 2006. Thomas has also served on industry, government, and international advisory boards.

== Awards ==
- 1985: Science Digest's Top 100 Scientific Innovations
- 1986: R&D Magazines R&D 100 Award
- 1989: Federal Laboratory Consortium Award for Excellence in Technology Transfer
- 1996: R&D Magazine's R&D 100 Award
- 1998: Federal Laboratory Consortium Award for Excellence in Technology Transfer
- 2007: Fellow, American Association for the Advancement of Science
- 2009: Christopher Columbus Fellowship Foundation Homeland Security Award
