= Kwan-Liu Ma =

American computer scientist

- Born: Taipei
- Citizenship: USA
- Education: University of Utah
- Known for: Binary Swap, Explorable Images, In Situ Visualization, Storyline Visualization, Graph Visualization, Big Data Visualization
- Awards: NSF PECASE Award, ACM Fellow, IEEE Fellow, IEEE VGTC Visualization Technical Achievement Award, IEEE Visualization Academy
- Scientific career
- Fields: Computer Science, Computer Graphics, Visualization, Human Computer Interaction
- Workplaces: University of California, Davis
- Thesis: Interactive Volume Visualization (1993)
- Doctoral advisor: Kris Sikorski

Kwan-Liu Ma is an American computer scientist. He was born and grew up in Taipei, Taiwan and came to the United States pursuing advanced study in 1983. He is a distinguished professor of computer science at the University of California, Davis. His research interests include visualization, computer graphics, human computer interaction, human-AI interaction, and high-performance computing.

== Biography ==
Ma received his B.S., M.S. and Ph.D. degrees all in computer science from the University of Utah in 1986, 1988, and 1993, respectively. During 1993-1999, Ma was a staff scientist at the Institute for Computer Applications in Science and Engineering (ICASE), NASA Langley Research Center, where he conducted research in scientific visualization and high-performance computing. Ma joined UC Davis faculty in July 1999 and funded the Visualization and Interface Design Innovation (VIDI) research group and UC Davis Center of Excellence for Visualization.

Ma is a leading researcher in Big Data visualization. He organized the NSF/DOE Workshop on Large Scientific and Engineering Data Visualization (with C. Johnson) in 1999 as well as the Panel on Visualizing Large Datasets: Challenges and Opportunities at ACM SIGGRAPH 1999. He participated in the NSF LSSDSV, ITR, and BigData programs, and led the DOE SciDAC Institute for Ultrascale Visualization, a five-year, multi-institution project. He and his students has convincingly demonstrated several advanced concepts for data visualization, such as in situ visualization (1995, 2006), visualization provenance (1999), hardware accelerated volume visualization (2001), machine learning assisted volume visualization (2004), explorable images (2010), machine learning assisted graph visualization (2017), etc. Ma has published over 400 articles and given over 300 invited talks.

Ma has been actively serving the research community by playing leading roles in several professional activities including VizSec, Ultravis, EGPGV, IEEE VIS, IEEE PacificVis, and IEEE LDAV. He has served as a papers co-chair for SciVis, InfoVis, EuroVis, PacificVis, and Graph Drawing. Professor Ma was associate editor for the IEEE Transactions on Visualization and Computer Graphics (2007-2011), IEEE Computer Graphics and Applications (2007-2019), and the Journal of Computational Science and Discovery (2009-2014). He presently serves on the editorial boards of the ACM Transactions on Interactive Intelligent Systems, the Journal of Visual Informatics, and the Journal Computational Visual Media.

Ma is a member of the Luxuriant Flowing Hair Club for Scientists (LFHCfS).

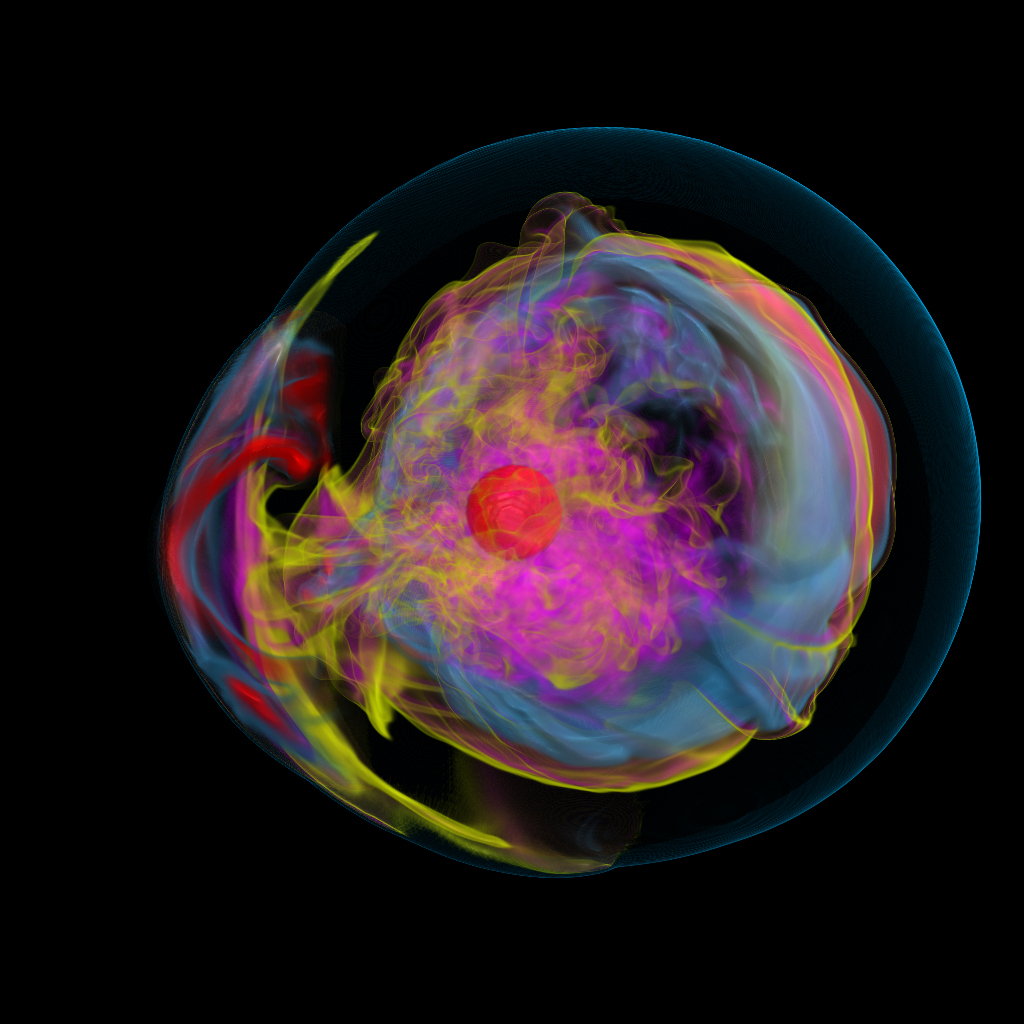
Supernova visualization made by Eric Lum (2003) for scientific storytelling with data provided by the Terascale Supernova Initiative.

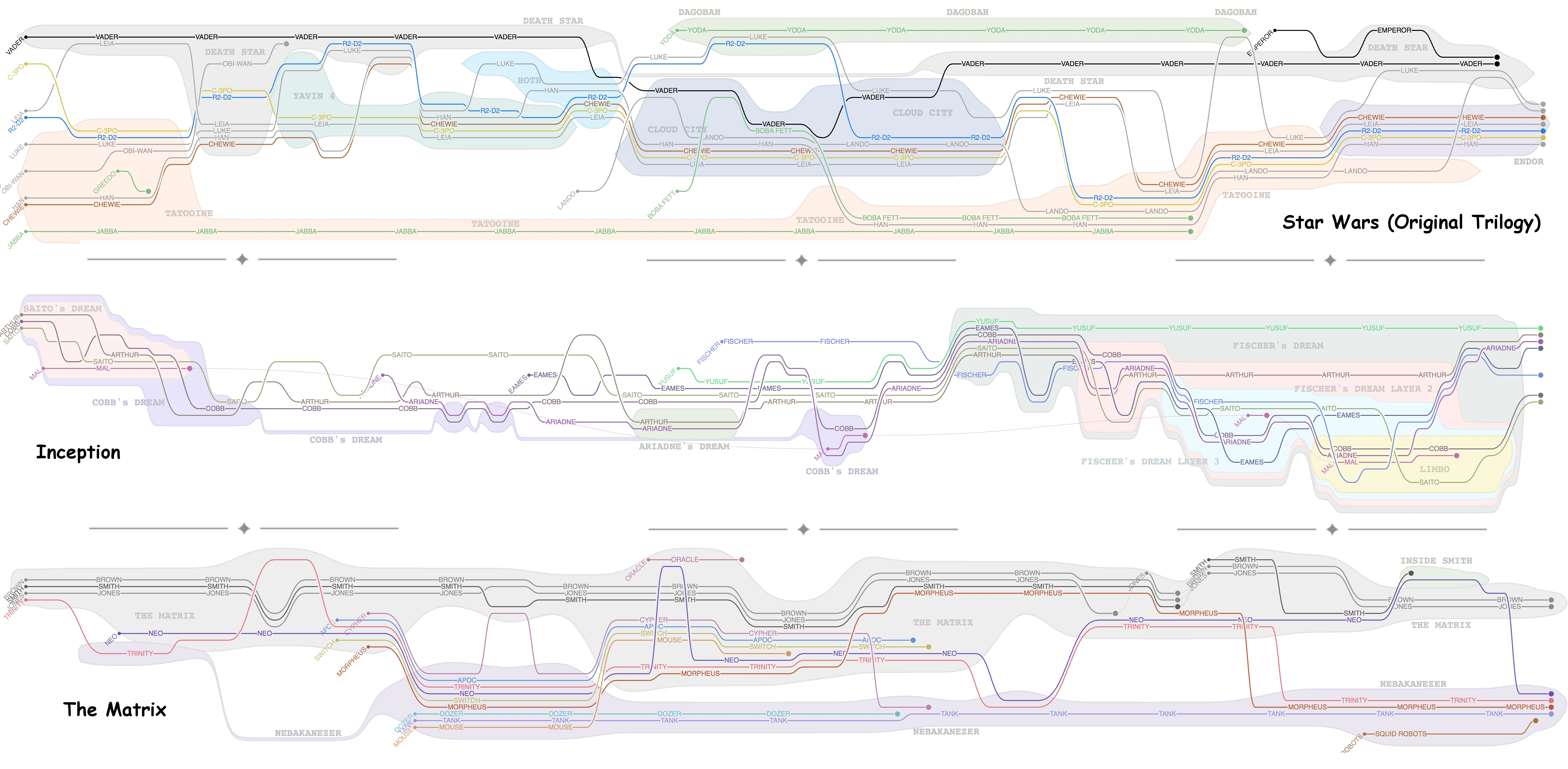
Movie storytelling with storyline visualization, designed by Yuzuru Takahashi (2012).

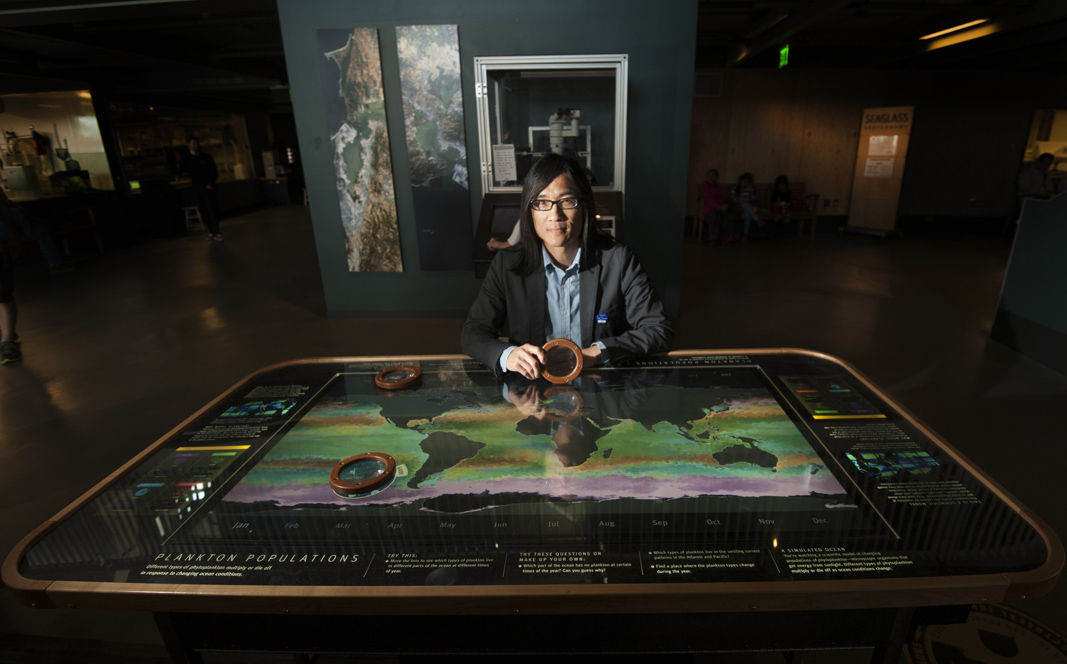
An interactive visualization exhibit, the Plankton Table (2012), on display at the Exploratorium in San Francisco.

Awards

- 1999 NSF CAREER Award
- 2000 NSF Presidential Early Career Award (PECASE)
- 2001 Schlumberger Foundation Technical Award
- 2007 UC Davis College of Engineering's Outstanding Mid-Career Research Faculty Award
- 2008, 2009, 2012 HP Labs Research Innovation Award
- 2012 IEEE Fellow
- 2013 IEEE VGTC Visualization Technical Achievement Award
- 2018 Distinguished Professor, UC Davis
- 2019 Inductee of the IEEE Visualization Academy
- 2023 UC Davis College of Engineering Outstanding Senior Faculty Award
- 2023 ACM Fellow
- 2026 IEEE PacificVis Service Award

== Selected publications ==
- David Bauer, Qi Wu, Hamid Gadirov, Kwan-Liu Ma: GSCache: Real-time Radiance Caching for Volume Path Tracing using 3D Gaussian Splatting. IEEE Transactions on Visualization and Computer Graphics 32(1): 901-911 (2026)
- Sam Yu-Te Lee, Aryaman Bahukhandi, Dongyu Liu, Kwan-Liu Ma: Towards Dataset-Scale and Feature-Oriented Evaluation of Text Summarization in Large Language Model Prompts. IEEE Transactions on Visualization and Computer Graphics 31(1): 481-491 (2025)
- Xiwei Xuan, Jorge Piazentin Ono, Liang Gou, Kwan-Liu Ma, Liu Ren: AttributionScanner: A Visual Analytics System for Model Validation with Metadata-Free Slice Finding. IEEE Transactions on Visualization and Computer Graphics 31(10): 7436-7447 (2025)
- Keshav Dasu, Yun-Hsin Kuo, Kwan-Liu Ma: Character-Oriented Design for Visual Data Storytelling. IEEE Transactions on Visualization and Computer Graphics 30(1): 8-108 (2024)
- Xiaoyu Zhang, Jorge Piazentin Ono, Huan Song, Liang Gou, Kwan-Liu Ma, Liu Ren: SliceTeller: A Data Slice-Driven Approach for Machine Learning Model Validation. IEEE Transactions on Visualization and Computer Graphics 29(1): 842-852 (2023)
- Takanori Fujiwara, Xinhai Wei, Jian Zhao, Kwan-Liu Ma: Interactive Dimensionality Reduction for Comparative Analysis. IEEE Transactions on Visualization and Computer Graphics 28(1): 758-768 (2022)
- Keshav Dasu, Kwan-Liu Ma, Joyce Ma, Jennifer Frazier: Sea of Genes: A Reflection on Visualizing Metagenomic Data for Museums. IEEE Transactions on Visualization and Computer Graphics 27(2): 935-945 (2021)
- Oh-Hyun Kwon, Kwan-Liu Ma: A Deep Generative Model for Graph Layout. IEEE Trans. Vis. Comput. Graph. 26(1): 665-675 (2020)
- Takanori Fujiwara, Oh-Hyun Kwon, Kwan-Liu Ma: Supporting Analysis of Dimensionality Reduction Results with Contrastive Learning. IEEE Trans. Vis. Comput. Graph. 26(1): 45-55 (2020)
- Jianping Kelvin Li, Kwan-Liu Ma: P5: Portable Progressive Parallel Processing Pipelines for Interactive Data Analysis and Visualization. IEEE Trans. Vis. Comput. Graph. 26(1): 1151-1160 (2020)
- Min Shih, Charles Rozhon, Kwan-Liu Ma: A Declarative Grammar of Flexible Volume Visualization Pipelines. IEEE Trans. Vis. Comput. Graph. 25(1): 1050-1059 (2019)
- Oleg Igouchkine, Yubo Zhang, Kwan-Liu Ma: Multi-Material Volume Rendering with a Physically-Based Surface Reflection Model. IEEE Trans. Vis. Comput. Graph. 24(12): 3147-3159 (2018)
- Chris Bryan, Gregory Guterman, Kwan-Liu Ma, Harris A. Lewin, Denis M. Larkin, Jaebum Kim, Jian Ma, Marta Farre: Synteny Explorer: An Interactive Visualization Application for Teaching Genome Evolution. IEEE Trans. Vis. Comput. Graph. 23(1): 711-720 (2017)
- Oh-Hyun Kwon, Chris Muelder, Kyungwon Lee, Kwan-Liu Ma: A Study of Layout, Rendering, and Interaction Methods for Immersive Graph Visualization. IEEE Trans. Vis. Comput. Graph. 22(7): 1802-1815 (2016)
- Yuzuru Tanahashi, Chien-Hsin Hsueh, Kwan-Liu Ma: An Efficient Framework for Generating Storyline Visualizations from Streaming Data. IEEE Trans. Vis. Comput. Graph. 21(6): 730-742 (2015)
- Franz Sauer, Hongfeng Yu, Kwan-Liu Ma: Trajectory-Based Flow Feature Tracking in Joint Particle/Volume Datasets. IEEE Trans. Vis. Comput. Graph. 20(12): 2565-2574 (2014)
- Yubo Zhang, Kwan-Liu Ma: Spatio-temporal extrapolation for fluid animation. ACM Trans. Graph. 32(6): 183:1-183:8 (2013)
- Carlos D. Correa, Tarik Crnovrsanin, Kwan-Liu Ma: Visual Reasoning about Social Networks Using Centrality Sensitivity. IEEE Trans. Vis. Comput. Graph. 18(1): 106-120 (2012)
- Nathaniel Fout, Kwan-Liu Ma: Fuzzy Volume Rendering. IEEE Trans. Vis. Comput. Graph. 18(12): 2335-2344 (2012)
- Joyce Ma, Isaac Liao, Kwan-Liu Ma, Jennifer Frazier: Living Liquid: Design and Evaluation of an Exploratory Visualization Tool for Museum Visitors. IEEE Trans. Vis. Comput. Graph. 18(12): 2799-2808 (2012)
- Wei-Hsien Hsu, Kwan-Liu Ma, Carlos D. Correa: A rendering framework for multiscale views of 3D models. ACM Trans. Graph. 30(6): 131 (2011)
- Anna Tikhonova, Carlos D. Correa, Kwan-Liu Ma: Visualization by Proxy: A Novel Framework for Deferred Interaction with Volume Data. IEEE Trans. Vis. Comput. Graph. 16(6): 1551-1559 (2010)
- Carlos D. Correa, Kwan-Liu Ma: Dynamic video narratives. ACM Trans. Graph. 29(4): 88:1-88:9 (2010)
- Kwan-Liu Ma: In Situ Visualization at Extreme Scale: Challenges and Opportunities. IEEE Computer Graphics and Applications 29(6): 14-19 (2009)
- Michael Ogawa, Kwan-Liu Ma: code_swarm: A Design Study in Organic Software Visualization. IEEE Trans. Vis. Comput. Graph. 15(6): 1097-1104 (2009)
- Chris Muelder, Kwan-Liu Ma: Rapid Graph Layout Using Space Filling Curves. IEEE Trans. Vis. Comput. Graph. 14(6): 1301-1308 (2008)
- Zeqian Shen, Kwan-Liu Ma, Tina Eliassi-Rad: Visual Analysis of Large Heterogeneous Social Networks by Semantic and Structural Abstraction. IEEE Trans. Vis. Comput. Graph. 12(6): 1427-1439 (2006)
- Fan-Yin Tzeng, Eric B. Lum, Kwan-Liu Ma: An Intelligent System Approach to Higher-Dimensional Classification of Volume Data. IEEE Trans. Vis. Comput. Graph. 11(3): 273-284 (2005)
- Eric B. Lum, Kwan-Liu Ma, John P. Clyne: A Hardware-Assisted Scalable Solution for Interactive Volume Rendering of Time-Varying Data. IEEE Trans. Vis. Comput. Graph. 8(3): 286-301 (2002)
- T. J. Jankun-Kelly, Kwan-Liu Ma: Visualization Exploration and Encapsulation via a Spreadsheet-Like Interface. IEEE Trans. Vis. Comput. Graph. 7(3): 275-287 (2001)
- Kwan-Liu Ma: Visualizing Visualizations: User Interfaces for Managing and Exploring Scientific Visualization Data. IEEE Computer Graphics and Applications 20(5): 16-19 (2000)
- Kwan-Liu Ma, James S. Painter, Charles D. Hansen, Michael Krogh: Parallel volume rendering using binary-swap compositing. IEEE Computer Graphics and Applications 14(4): 59-68 (1994)
