= David Laidlaw =

American scholar

- Education: Brown University; Caltech
- Scientific career
- Doctoral advisor: Alan Howard Barr

David Hales Laidlaw is an American computer scientist. He is currently Professor of Computer Science at Brown University in Providence, Rhode Island. In 2014 he became a Fellow of the Institute of Electrical and Electronics Engineers (IEEE) for contributions to data visualization and analytics. In 2019, he was named to the IEEE Visualization Academy.

Laidlaw earned a Bachelor of Science in computer science from Brown University in 1983. He earned a Master of Science in computer science at Brown in 1985 and another masters degree at the California Institute of Technology in 1992. He completed his doctorate at Caltech in 1995 under the direction of Alan Howard Barr.
