= Pacific Northwest National Laboratory =

American research institute

Coordinates: 46.343224°N 119.276333°W

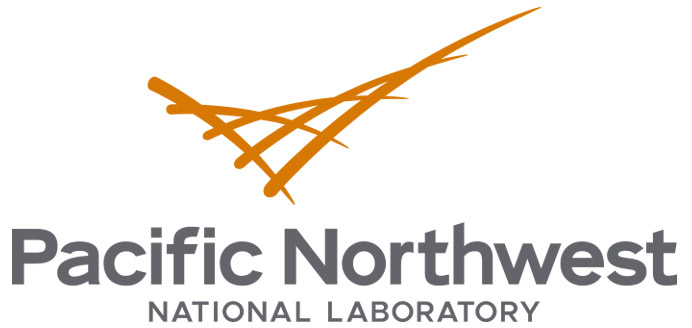
- Pacific Northwest National Laboratory logo, U.S. Department of Energy
- Nickname: PNNL
- Established: January 4, 1965; 61 years ago
- Budget: $1.49 billion
- Field of research: Energy, national security and the environment.
- Director: Deborah (Deb) Gracio
- Staff: 6,089
- Location: 902 Battelle Boulevard, Richland, Washington (main campus)
- Affiliations: United States Department of Energy
- Operating agency: Battelle Memorial Institute
- Website: www.pnnl.gov

Pacific Northwest National Laboratory (PNNL) is one of the United States Department of Energy national laboratories, managed by the Department of Energy's (DOE) Office of Science. The main campus of the laboratory is in Richland, Washington, with additional research facilities around the country.

Originally named the Pacific Northwest Laboratory, PNL was established in 1965 when research and development at the Hanford Site was separated from other Hanford operations. In 1995, the laboratory was renamed the Pacific Northwest National Laboratory (PNNL).

== Research facilities ==
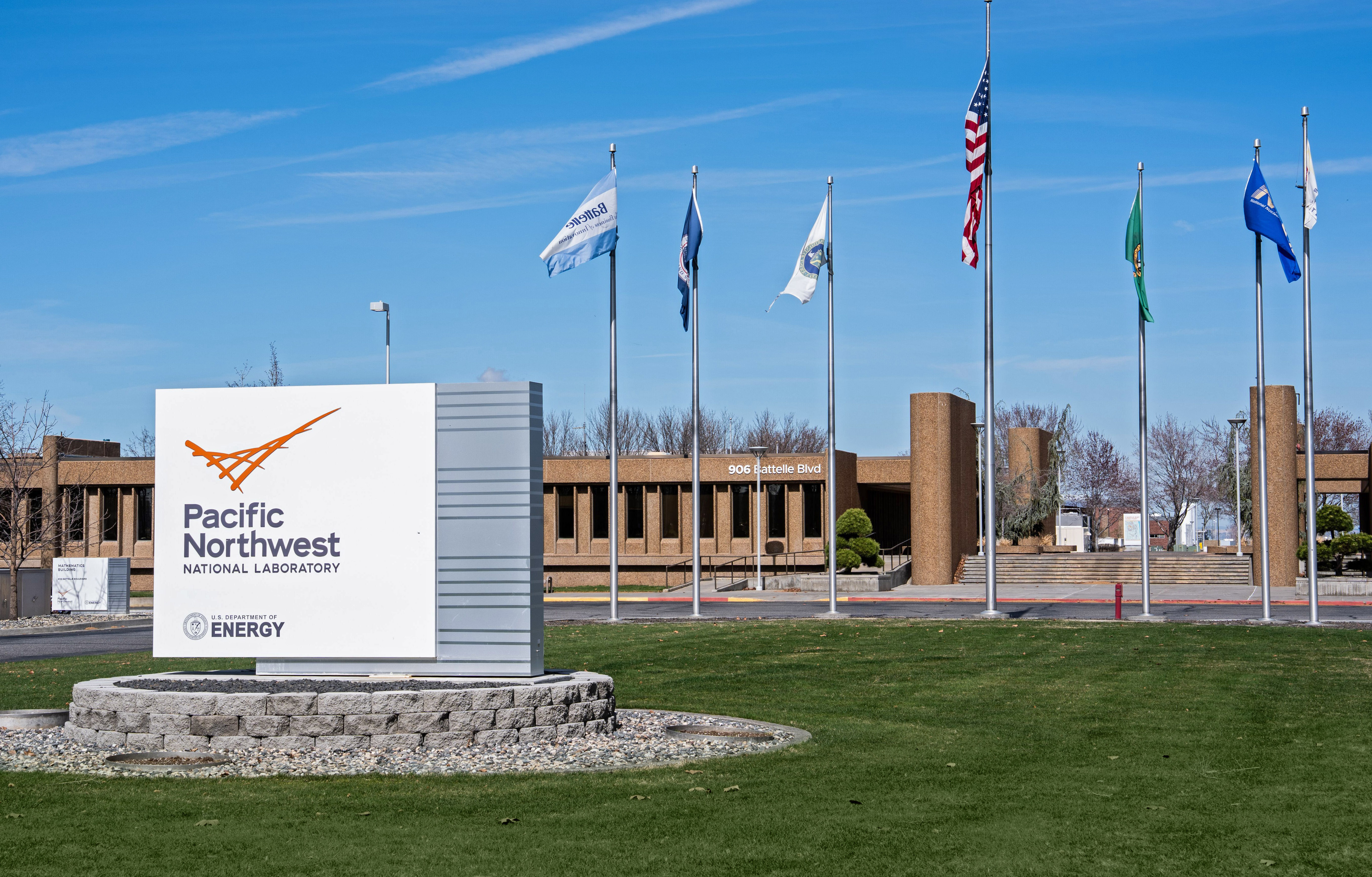
Pacific Northwest National Laboratory Campus. PNNL has been operated for the U.S. Department of Energy by Battelle Memorial Institute since 1965.

The Environmental Molecular Sciences Laboratory (EMSL) is a U.S. Department of Energy national scientific user facility. EMSL provides researchers around the world with integrated capabilities in oxide and mineral interface chemistry, high-performance computing and computational chemistry software, mass spectrometry, high-field magnetic resonance, and subsurface flow and transport research.

The Bioproducts, Sciences, and Engineering Laboratory (BSEL) is a joint effort between Washington State University and PNNL, and is located on the WSU-Tri-Cities campus. Within BSEL, researchers are developing technology for converting agricultural byproducts into chemicals for products like plastics, solvents, fibers, pharmaceuticals, and fuel additives.

Researchers at PNNL's Radiochemical Processing Laboratory are developing processes to advance the cleanup of radiological and hazardous wastes; the processing and disposal of nuclear fuels; and the production and delivery of medical isotopes.

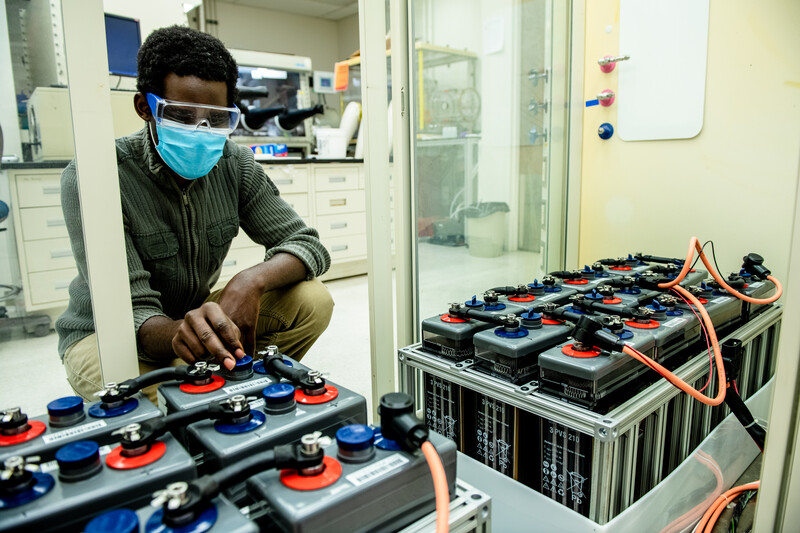
Battery reliability testing at the laboratory

Three research facilities were constructed on PNNL's Richland, Washington campus to partially replace laboratory and office space PNNL had been using on the south end of the nearby Hanford Site.

The Physical Sciences Facility, a federally funded research complex, houses research in materials science, radiation detection, and ultra-trace analysis. The privately funded Computational Sciences Facility and Biological Sciences Facility house about 310 staff who support PNNL's energy, environmental, national security, and fundamental science research missions. These two new facilities opened in 2009. The CSF contains scientific capabilities in information analytics, high-performance computing, cyber security and bioinformatics. The BSF focuses on bioenergy, environmental and soil remediation and includes systems biology, microbial and cellular biology and analytical interfacial chemistry.

The Electricity Infrastructure Operations Center at PNNL combines software, real-time power grid data and computation into a control room setting. The ideas and technologies developed in the EIOC address better management of the power grid. The EIOC also is available to utilities, vendors, government agencies and universities interested in research, development or training.

PNNL-Sequim (2022–present), previously known as the Marine and Coastal Research Laboratory (2021) and the Marine Sciences Laboratory (1966–2021), located at Sequim, Washington, is the DOE's only marine laboratory. PNNL-Sequim provides analytical and general-purpose laboratories, as well as wet or support laboratories supplied with heated and cooled freshwater and seawater. More than 20 engineers and scientists work on coastal restoration and security projects, from reviving salmon habitat to research on how shellfish could detect a bioterrorist attack. PNNL-Sequim also operates a 28-foot (8.5 m) research vessel.

Other PNNL research facilities include the following:

- Research Aircraft
- Joint Global Change Research Institute
- Shallow underground laboratory for low-activity radiation measurement

== Awards and honors ==
PNNL staff have received numerous awards and recognition. These achievements include 126 R&D100 Awards, 102 Federal Laboratory Consortium Awards, seven E. O. Lawrence Awards, and two Department of Energy Office of Science Distinguished Scientist Fellowships. PNNL staff serve as editors-in-chief for scientific journals, hold office in national and international technical societies, and have been granted Guggenheim fellowships, Humboldt Research Awards, and society medals. Staff have been elected to the rank of fellow in national societies including, but not limited to, the American Association for the Advancement of Science, American Physical Society, the Materials Research Society, and the American Chemical Society.

== Facts and figures ==
- 6,089 staff members (scientists, engineers and business professionals)
- Annual spending of $1.49 billion (2023)
- 126 R&D 100 Awards for significant innovations since 1969
- 102 Federal Laboratory Consortium awards for technology transfer since 1984
- 301 invention disclosures (2023)
- 50 U.S. patents granted (2023)
- According to Essential Science Indicators rankings, PNNL ranks among top 1% in publications and citations (FY13) in:
  - Biology and biochemistry
  - Chemistry
  - Clinical medicine
  - Engineering
  - Environment and ecology
  - Geosciences
  - Materials science
  - Microbiology
  - Pharmacology and toxicology
  - Physics
- The main campus is located in Richland, Washington; PNNL operates a marine research facility in Sequim, and has satellite offices in Seattle, Washington; Portland, Oregon; College Park, Maryland, and Washington, D.C. The Laboratory has been operated by Ohio-based Battelle since 1965.

== History ==
This November 1964 Tri-City Herald newspaper clip announces Battelle has been selected to manage the new Pacific Northwest Laboratory in Richland beginning in January 1965.

PNNL was established in 1965 but traces its origins to World War II, in the establishment of the Hanford Site in 1943. Plutonium production for the Manhattan Project required extensive research and development activities at the Hanford Site. The General Electric Company began operating the site in 1946 and consolidated R&D into the new Hanford Laboratory in 1953. After GE ended its contract in 1963 to avoid conflicts with its growing commercial nuclear business, the Atomic Energy Commission split the Hanford contract among several organizations, awarding the laboratory contract to Ohio-based Battelle Memorial Institute. Battelle took over operations on January 4, 1965, and named it the Pacific Northwest Laboratory.

Initially, PNL's research emphasized nuclear energy and non-destructive uses for nuclear materials, including the design for the Fast Flux Test Facility to test fuels and materials for the AEC's commercial nuclear power program. However, PNL scientists and engineers also worked on nongovernment projects. Jim Russell patented a method for optical digital recording and playback, eventually used in compact discs and digital video discs, while a Senior Scientist at PNL in the 1960s and 1970s. In 1969, NASA chose PNL to measure the concentration of both solar and galactic cosmic-ray-produced radionuclides in lunar material collected from the entire Apollo program.

In the 1970s, PNL expanded into energy, environment, health and national security research. The shift occurred as the AEC was replaced by the Energy Research and Development Administration (ERDA) in 1974 and the Department of Energy in 1977. During this period, researchers at PNL developed vitrification, a process to lock hazardous waste inside glass, and an acoustic holography technique allowing medical personnel to view internal organs, detect fetal abnormalities, and locate blood clots without an operation.

In the 1980s, PNL researchers introduced the first portable blood irradiator for leukemia treatments, and worked with the Fred Hutchinson Cancer Research Center in Seattle under a cooperative research and development agreement to develop safe and effective protocols for its use. In the mid-1980s, PNL became one of the U.S. Department of Energy's multiprogram laboratories.

In 1995, the laboratory was renamed the Pacific Northwest National Laboratory. The Laboratory's global environmental and nuclear nonproliferation work moved to the forefront during the 1990s. The Pacific Northwest Center for Global Security was established to coordinate nuclear nonproliferation programs, research and policy work within the Laboratory and throughout the region. The Material Identification System and the Ultrasonic Pulse Echo instrument, technologies developed at Pacific Northwest National Laboratory, were provided to customs inspectors in Eastern Europe and former Soviet Union republics to reduce smuggling and terrorism. Researchers also studied global climate models, including cloud formation and radiative properties of clouds. In addition, the Laboratory created energy efficiency centers to promote economic growth while mitigating its harmful effects and participating on the United Nations panel on climate change assessments.

In 2007, more than 20 PNNL scientists were recognized for their contributions to the Intergovernmental Panel on Climate Change (IPCC) that received the 2007 Nobel Peace Prize in equal parts with former Vice President Al Gore.

Technologies to counter acts of terrorism have progressed at PNNL in this decade with the expansion of radiation portal monitoring technology developed at the Laboratory. This technology is used at ports of entry around the country to scan for and detect the presence of nuclear and radiological materials. In 2004, The U.S. Department of Homeland Security established the National Visualization and Analytics Center (NVAC) to advance visualization research using computer technology to enable humans to visually synthesize and derive insight from massive amounts of information to help the nation predict and respond to manmade and natural disasters and terrorist incidents.

PNNL scientists are designing catalysts to use solar energy to power reactions that turn water into hydrogen. They are incorporating the concepts of energy matching and proton relays to design inexpensive nickel and cobalt containing molecular complexes that catalyze that reaction. DOE has awarded $22.5 million over five years for PNNL's new Center for Molecular Electrocatalysis, where scientists will study catalysts that convert electrical energy into chemical bonds and back again.

== Directors ==
The following persons served as the Pacific Northwest National Laboratory director:

No.	Image	Director	Term start	Term end	Refs.
1		Sherwood Fawcett	1965	1967	
2		Fred Albaugh	1967	1971	
3		Ron Paul	1971	1973	
4		Ed Alpen	1973	1975	
5		Tommy Ambrose	1975	1979	
6		Doug Olesen	1979	1984	
7		William R. Wiley	1984	1994	
8		Bill Madia	1994	2000	
9		Lura Powell	2000	2003	
10		Leonard Peters	April 1, 2003	2007	
interim		Mike Kluse	January 2007	May 2008	
11		Mike Kluse	May 2008	March 31, 2015	
12		Steve Ashby	April 1, 2015	September 30, 2025	
13		Deborah Gracio	October 1, 2025	present	
