= Joseph Oliger =

American computer scientist (1941–2005)

- Born: September 3, 1941; Milan, Indiana
- Died: August 28, 2005 (aged 63); Truckee, California
- Education: University of Colorado Boulder; Uppsala University
- Scientific career
- Fields: Computer science
- Workplaces: Stanford University
- Doctoral advisor: Heinz-Otto Kreiss
- Doctoral students: Margot Gerritsen
- Other notable students: Tony F. Chan; Nick Trefethen

Joseph E. Oliger (September 3, 1941 – August 28, 2005) was an American computer scientist and professor at Stanford University. Oliger was the co-founder of the Science in Computational and Mathematical Engineering degree program at Stanford, and served as the director of the Research Institute for Advanced Computer Science.

== Early life and education ==
Oliger was born in Indiana in 1941, the son of salesman Emmert Oliger and homemaker Catherine Oliger, and grew up on a farm in Greensburg, Indiana. Oliger graduated from the University of Colorado Boulder with a B.S. in mathematics in 1966, and later continued on to complete an M.S. in applied math in 1971.

From 1965 to 1973, Oliger worked as a computer programmer and analyst at the National Center for Atmospheric Research (NCAR) in Boulder, Colorado. There, Oliger met Heinz-Otto Kreiss, who was a professor at Uppsala University at the time, and they began working together. Kreiss became Oliger's PhD advisor, and Oliger completed his Ph.D. from Uppsala University in 1973.

== Research focus ==
Oliger is known for his work on numerical methods to approximate solutions of partial differential equations, with applications to weather forecasting. For example, in his early work with Heinz in 1972, for a model problem on wave propagation Oliger determined to what order of Fourier analysis was required to guarantee a desired level of accuracy. Along with Marsha Berger and Philip Colella, Oliger developed the technique of adaptive mesh refinement. One adaptive mesh refinement algorithm first developed by Berger and Oliger, and later refined by Berger and Colella, is taught today and referred to as the Berger-Oliger or Berger-Oliger-Colella method.

== Stanford University ==
In 1974, Oliger joined the Computer Science department at Stanford University as an assistant professor. In 1987, Oliger co-founded the Science in Computational and Mathematical Engineering degree program at Stanford with three colleagues. As a professor at Stanford, Oliger graduated over 20 PhD students and currently has over 100 academic descendants.

Oliger was the author of the widely used textbook, Time-Dependent Problems and Difference Methods, with Bertil Gustafsson and Heinz-Otto Kreiss.

Oliger served as the director of the Research Institute for Advanced Computer Science in the 1990s.

In 2001, Oliger retired from Stanford.
