= Gabrielle Allen =

British and American astrophysicist

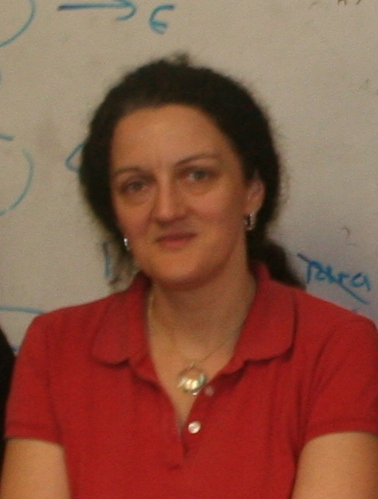
- Allen in 2007
- Education: University of Nottingham (BA) Cardiff University (PhD)
- Occupation: Astrophysicist
- Employer: University of Wyoming

Gabrielle D. Allen is a British and American computational astrophysicist known for her work in astrophysical simulations and multi-messenger astronomy, and as one of the original developers of the Cactus Framework for parallel scientific computation. She is a professor of mathematics and statistics at the University of Wyoming.

== Education and career ==
Allen is originally from Barking, London. She earned a bachelor's degree in mathematics from the University of Nottingham in 1988, and took Part III of the Mathematical Tripos at the University of Cambridge in applied mathematics and mathematical physics in the following year. She completed her Ph.D. in physics at Cardiff University in 1993, and also has a Masters of Advanced Study in mathematics from the University of Cambridge, earned in 2011.

She became a researcher at the Max Planck Institute for Gravitational Physics before moving in 2003 to a position as an assistant professor at Louisiana State University. She became a program director for cyberinfrastructure at the National Science Foundation in 2010, became a professor at the Skolkovo Institute of Science and Technology in Russia in 2012, and moved to the University of Illinois at Urbana–Champaign in 2014. At the University of Illinois, she became a professor of astronomy and a senior research scientist in the National Center for Supercomputing Applications, where she was co-leader of the Gravity Group. She was also named Associate Dean for Research in the university's College of Education in 2016.

She moved to the University of Wyoming, as a professor of mathematics and statistics, in 2020, in connection with her partner Ed Seidel's accession as president of the university.

== Recognition ==
Allen was one of the 2001 winners of the Gordon Bell Prize for supercomputing, in the special category, "for supporting efficient execution in the heterogeneous distributed computing environments with Cactus and Globus".

She was named a Fellow of the American Physical Society (APS) in 2017, after a nomination from the APS Division of Computational Physics, "for international leadership in development of widely used simulation frameworks for numerical relativity, relativistic astrophysics, and other areas, laying a foundation for many groups to address complex problems in multi-messenger astronomy".
