= Emory Seidel =

American sculptor and painter

Emory Pius Seidel (May 14, 1881 – April 23, 1954) was a Chicago sculptor, painter and designer who created numerous sculptures and paintings that are displayed publicly throughout the United States. He was affiliated with the Art Institute of Chicago. In 1925, he was awarded the John C. Shaffer Prize from the Art Institute of Chicago. His work is considered to be part of the "Art Deco" style.

== Early life and education ==
Seidel was the third of ten children born to Emeron Michael Seidel and Amelia Wolf and was born in Baltimore, Maryland. He began formal art studies at the age of 10. He studied art under Ephraim Keyser in the Maryland Institute of Baltimore and also worked under Charles Mulligan of Chicago. He also studied under Wellington J Reynolds.

== Move to Chicago ==
It is not known when he moved to Chicago but he was already there by 1903.

== Awards and recognition ==
E. P. Seidel won the Palette & Chisel Gold Medal award in 1927. He was in the Art Institute of Chicago vicinity show 17 times between 1913–1933, and won the AIC Shaffer prize in 1935, the Worcester prize 1926, and was mentioned in Lorado Taft's History of American Sculpture. He was in the 1939 Art Institute retrospective "50 Years of American Art" exhibit, and he served on the jury of selection for the 1935 "American Painting and Sculpture" exhibit at the Art Institute.

Circa 1930, he also had an exhibit with P&C member Carl Krafft, which was described by the gallery as follows:

To see his tender replicas of children in all their grace and elfin charm is to be at once in sympathy with this artist, enthralled by the blossom like beauty possessed by these mysterious little people. In his modeling of grown up children, we find his hand vigorous in shaping the silken petals into ragged and virile character, the striving and restless human, the youthful breaklance that means to give a good account of himself in the end. His message is written strong in about 15 clay models.

== Personal ==
Emory married Hildegarde Erbsmehl of Michigan and they had three children, David, Virginia, and Ann.

== Works ==
He completed local commissions for public sculpture—for the Damen Avenue bridge just north of Fullerton, and for the New York Street Memorial Bridge in Aurora.

The Memory Sculptures are part of an entire bridge designed to commemorate the veterans of World War I. In 1930 Seidel designed the original plans for the bridge. As a period publication stated, using an artist made the bridge “remarkable in its beauty and unique in its design... which will help bring realization that bridges need not be as drab as gas tanks, telephone poles and other things that must be put up with along public thoroughfares.”

Dedicated on Armistice Day, November 11, 1931, the New York Street Pershing Memorial Bridge integrates several figures into the concrete structure, two at each end in mirror image, and in niches at the center of the bridge deck. Each statue shows a hooded female figure in a kneeling position, her eyes closed in retrospection. One hand rests on a plain slab in front of her holding a wreath. Her other hand, resting in her lap, clasps a helmet of the World War I dough-boy type. The figures rise 10 feet 6 inches above the sidewalk level, while the folds of their robes flow down the piers, incorporating them into the structure of the bridge. The sculptures are made of aggregate concrete. The allegories' robes flow down to form the pylons of the bridge. In 2001 the Aurora City Council considered approval of a restoration of the art work on the bridge, which is listed on the National Register of Historic Places.

He is also responsible for the bronze relief that is part of the monument dedicated in 1930 in honor of Jacques Marquette next to the Damen Avenue bridge over the Chicago River's South Branch.

The Morgan Memorial in Freeport, Illinois is one of the most appreciated attractions of Read Park.

== See also ==
- Ed Seidel
