= Margot Gerritsen =

Dutch mathematician

- Born: Netherlands
- Education: Stanford University, Delft University of Technology
- Scientific career
- Fields: Numerical Analysis
- Workplaces: Stanford University
- Thesis: Designing an Efficient Solution Strategy for Fluid Flows (1997)
- Doctoral advisor: Joseph E. Oliger
- Website: people.stanford.edu/gerritsn/people

Margot Geertrui Gerritsen is a professor of Energy Resources Engineering at Stanford University and a senior associate dean for educational initiatives in the Stanford University School of Earth, Energy & Environmental Sciences. Her research interests include energy production, ocean dynamics, and sailboat design.

Gerritsen was born in the Netherlands. She earned a master's degree at Delft University of Technology. She completed her doctorate in 1996 in scientific computing and computational mathematics at Stanford, under the supervision of Joseph Oliger. Between 1996-2001, she was a faculty member in the Department of Engineering Science in Auckland, New Zealand. Gerritsen then worked at the University of Auckland before rejoining Stanford as a faculty member in 2001.

She was named a SIAM Fellow in 2018.
