= Bertil Gustafsson =

Swedish mathematician and numerical analyst

- Born: 1939 (age 86–87)
- Education: Uppsala University, (Ph.D., 1971)
- Known for: GKS theory for initial-boundary value problems
- Scientific career
- Fields: Numerical analysis
- Workplaces: Uppsala University; Stanford University
- Doctoral advisor: Heinz-Otto Kreiss

Bertil Gustafsson (born 1939) is a Swedish applied mathematician and numerical analyst. He is currently a Professor emeritus in the Department of Information Technology at Uppsala University, Sweden. Gustafsson is known for his work in numerical methods for time-dependent partial differential equations and its applications in fluid dynamics. He is the G in GKS (Gustafsson–Kreiss–Sundstrom) theory for initial-boundary value problems which discusses the stability criterion for numerical approximations of initial–boundary value problems. Gustafsson has also authored a couple of books on the topic numerical methods applied to PDE.

== Education and career ==
Gustafsson attended senior high school in Norrköping, a city in Sweden. In 1962, he joined Uppsala University, where there was a tradition of prominent mathematicians, including Arne Beurling and Lennart Carleson. At Uppsala, Gustafsson developed a strong preference for applied mathematics and when he was in his second year, Heinz-Otto Kreiss joined Uppsala University. It was Kreiss who introduced young Gustafsson to numerical analysis, and the then new field of computing. In 1971, Gustafsson received his Ph.D. degree under the supervision of Kreiss. His dissertation was on difference methods for hyperbolic equations. Gustafsson has continued to pursue numerical methods in differential equations for most of his career, and much of his early work consisted of applying his theoretical developments to practical problems. These included weather prediction, both in Sweden and at the National Center for Atmospheric Research based in Boulder, Colorado.

In 2002, he was elected a member of the Royal Swedish Academy of Sciences.

== Books ==
- High Order Difference Methods for Time Dependent PDE, Springer-Verlag (2008). ISBN 3-540-74992-6
- Time Dependent Problems and Difference Methods, with Heinz-Otto Kreiss and Joseph Oliger, John Wiley (1995).
