= Phillip Colella =

American mathematician

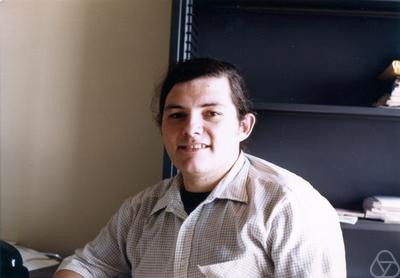
- Colella in 1980
- Born: June 28, 1952 (age 74)
- Education: University of California, Berkeley
- Known for: High-resolution schemes Adaptive mesh refinement
- Awards: Member National Academy of Sciences (2004); SIAM/ACM prize (2003); Sidney Fernbach Award (1998)
- Scientific career
- Fields: Applied Mathematics
- Workplaces: Lawrence Livermore National Laboratory; Lawrence Berkeley National Laboratory; University of California, Berkeley
- Thesis: An Analysis of the Effect of Operator Splitting and of the Sampling Procedure on the Accuracy of Glimm's Method (1979)
- Doctoral advisor: Alexandre Chorin

Phillip Colella is an American applied mathematician and a member of the Applied Numerical Algorithms Group at the Lawrence Berkeley National Laboratory. He has also worked at Lawrence Livermore National Laboratory. He is known for his fundamental contributions in the development of mathematical methods and numerical tools used to solve partial differential equations, including high-resolution and adaptive mesh refinement schemes. Colella is a member of the US National Academy of Sciences.

== Career ==
Colella received his bachelor's degree in 1974, Master's degree in 1976, and Ph.D. in 1979 degree from the University of California, Berkeley, all in applied mathematics. He received the Ph.D. degree under the supervision of Alexandre Chorin. He began his research career at Lawrence Berkeley National Laboratory, University of California, California. His primary area of research involves the development of high-resolution schemes and adaptive mesh refinement methods for the solution of partial differential equations. He has also applied computational methods in a variety of scientific and engineering fields, including low-speed incompressible flows, shock wave theory, combustion, magnetohydrodynamics, and astrophysical flows. Colella has also been the leader of a project in NASA's Computational Technologies for Earth and Space Sciences, called "Block-Structured Adaptive Mesh Refinement Methods for Multiphase Microgravity Flows and Star Formation".

== Awards and honors ==
Colella is a member of the National Academy of Sciences since 2004 and Fellow of Society for Industrial and Applied Mathematics (SIAM). He is the recipient of many honors, including the Sidney Fernbach Award from the IEEE Computer Society in 1998, given each year to one person who has made "an outstanding contribution in the application of high performance computers using innovative approaches." He has also received the SIAM/ACM prize (with John Bell) for computational science and engineering in 2003.

== Selected papers ==
- Colella, P.; Woodward, P. R. (April 1984). "Piecewise parabolic method (PPM) for gas-dynamical simulations" (PDF). J. Comput. Phys. 54 (1): 174–201. Bibcode:1984JCoPh..54..174C. doi:10.1016/0021-9991(84)90143-8. Archived from the original (PDF) on 2013-10-01.
- Colella, P.; Woodward, P. R. (1984). "The numerical simulation of two-dimensional fluid flow with strong shocks" (PDF). J. Comput. Phys. 54 (1): 115–173. Bibcode:1984JCoPh..54..115W. doi:10.1016/0021-9991(84)90142-6. Archived from the original (PDF) on 2009-03-06.
- Berger, M. J.; Colella, P. (1989). "Local adaptive mesh refinement for shock hydrodynamics" (PDF). J. Comput. Phys. 82 (1): 64–84. Bibcode:1989JCoPh..82...64B. doi:10.1016/0021-9991(89)90035-1. Archived from the original (PDF) on 2016-12-23.
- Bell, J. B.; Colella, P.; Glaz, H. M. (1989). "A second-order projection method for the incompressible Navier-Stokes equations" (PDF). J. Comput. Phys. 85 (2): 257–283. Bibcode:1989JCoPh..85..257B. CiteSeerX 10.1.1.392.8098. doi:10.1016/0021-9991(89)90151-4. Archived from the original (PDF) on 2016-12-27.
