= Ed Seidel =

American computer scientist

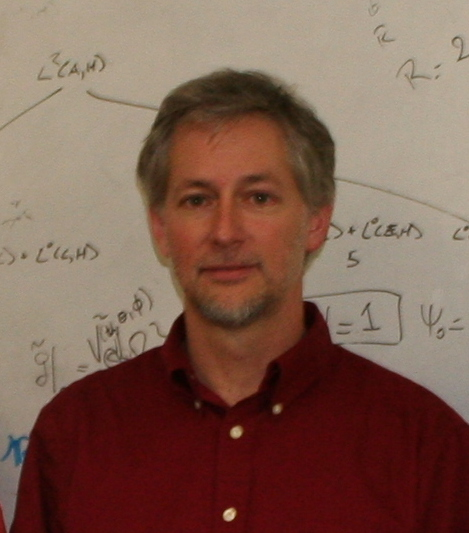

28th President of the University of Wyoming
- In office July 1, 2020 – June 30, 2026
- Preceded by: Neil Theobald
- Succeeded by: Shane R. Reeves

Personal details
- Born: August 21, 1957 (age 69) Bethesda, Maryland, U.S.
- Education: College of William and Mary (BS); University of Pennsylvania (MS); Yale University (PhD)
- Scientific career
- Awards: Sidney Fernbach Award; Gordon Bell Prize
- Fields: Physics
- Workplaces: National Center for Supercomputing Applications; Albert Einstein Institute; Skolkovo Institute of Science and Technology; Louisiana State University; University of Wyoming
- Thesis: Perturbation methods for the calculation of gravitational waves from slightly nonspherical spacetimes with applications to stellar core collapse (1988)
- Doctoral advisor: Vincent Moncrief

Edward Seidel (born August 21, 1957) is an American academic administrator and scientist who served as the president of the University of Wyoming from July 1, 2020 to July 1, 2026. He previously served as the Vice President for Economic Development and Innovation for the University of Illinois System, as well as a Founder Professor in the Department of Physics and a professor in the Department of Astronomy at the University of Illinois at Urbana-Champaign. He was the director of the National Center for Supercomputing Applications at Illinois from 2014 to 2017.

== Early life and education ==
Seidel was born in Bethesda, Maryland. Seidel is a relative of Chicago artist Emory Seidel. He earned a Bachelor of Science in mathematics and physics from the College of William & Mary, Master of Science in physics from the University of Pennsylvania, and PhD in relativistic astrophysics from Yale University. Seidel's research has focused on astronomy, physics, and computer science.

== Career ==
Seidel moved to Baton Rouge, Louisiana to lead the LSU Center for Computation and Technology in 2003. Prior to his work at CCT, he worked at the Albert Einstein Institute in Potsdam, Germany and also worked as a research scientist and professor at the National Center for Supercomputing Applications at the University of Illinois at Urbana-Champaign.

From September 2012 until January 2014, he was the senior vice president for research and innovation at the Skolkovo Institute of Science and Technology. Previously, he was the assistant director for Mathematical and Physical Sciences at the National Science Foundation and was director of NSF's Office of Cyberinfrastructure.

Before moving to NSF, Seidel was the founding director of the LSU Center for Computation & Technology, or CCT, in Baton Rouge, Louisiana. He is a career computer scientist and physicist who has received a number of awards for his work. His most noted achievements are in the field of numerical relativity, which involves solving Einstein's equations on computers. Seidel's research groups are known for modeling black hole collisions and for work in scientific computing. He is also a co-founder of the Cactus Framework.

In Louisiana, Seidel served as the first Chief Scientist for the Louisiana Optical Network Initiative, or LONI, which connects supercomputing resources throughout Louisiana to enable faster and more accurate research collaboration.

In November 2006, Seidel received the Sidney Fernbach Award at the Supercomputing Conference in Tampa, Florida. for "outstanding contributions to the development of software for HPC and Grid computing to enable the collaborative numerical investigation of complex problems in physics; in particular, modeling black hole collisions." This award, which is one of the highest honors in computing, was given for his achievements in numerical relativity.

In 1998 Seidel was awarded the Max Planck Society's Heinz-Billing-Preis award, for the "achievements of those who have spent time and effort developing the hardware and software crucial for scientific advances. He shared the Gordon Bell Prize in 2001 with colleagues.

Seidel was the Floating Point Systems Professor in Louisiana State University LSU's Departments of Physics and Astronomy and Computer Science.

Seidel was named President of the University of Wyoming in 2020, where he has pursued the creation of a School of Computing, the Wyoming Outdoor Recreation, Tourism and Hospitality (WORTH) Initiative, and the Center for Entrepreneurship and Innovation.
