= Timothy Trainor =

America university administrator

Timothy E. Trainor
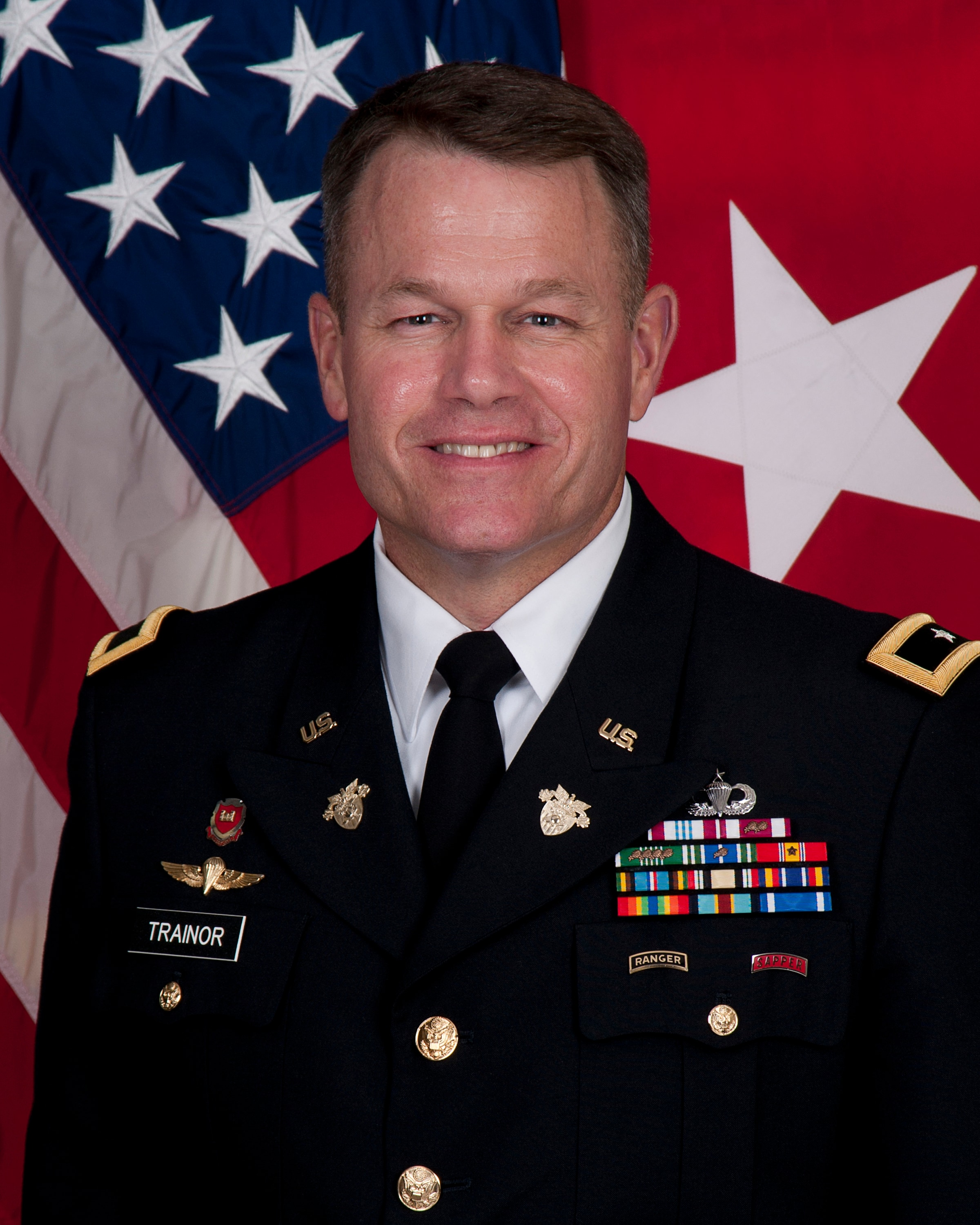
- Timothy Trainor as an Army brigadier general

26th President of Mount St. Mary's University
- In office August 15, 2016 – June 30, 2024
- Preceded by: Simon Newman
- Succeeded by: Gerard J. Joyce

13th Dean of United States Military Academy
- In office July 1, 2010 – June 23, 2016
- Preceded by: Patrick Finnegan
- Succeeded by: Cindy Jebb

Personal details
- Born: January 25, 1961 (age 65) New York, U.S.
- Education: U.S. Military Academy (BS); Duke University (MBA); North Carolina State University (PhD)

Military service
- Allegiance: United States
- Branch/service: United States Army
- Years of service: 1983–2016
- Rank: Brigadier General
- Commands: Dean of the United States Military Academy (2010–2016)

Timothy Edgar Trainor (born January 25, 1961) was the President of Mount St. Mary's University from 2016 to 2024. Previously, Trainor was a United States Army brigadier general where he served as the 13th Dean of the United States Military Academy.

== Early life and education ==
Born in the state of New York, Trainor graduated from West Point with a B.S. degree in 1983. He later earned an M.B.A. degree from the Fuqua School of Business at Duke University. Trainor completed a Ph.D. degree in industrial engineering at North Carolina State University in 2001. His doctoral thesis was entitled Scheduling military deployments and his advisors were Thom J. Hodgson and Russell E. King.

== Military career ==
Upon graduation from West Point, Trainor was commissioned as an engineering officer. While on active duty Trainor served in a variety positions including in Germany, Honduras, Fort Bragg, North Carolina, Fort Riley, Kansas and Sarajevo, Bosnia.

== US Military Academy ==
Trainor's prior duties at the U.S. Military Academy included the director of the Engineering Management program and head of the Department of Systems Engineering. In the summer of 2010, Secretary of Defense Robert Gates announced that President Barack Obama had nominated Trainor to become the next Dean. As Dean, Trainor oversaw over 800 faculty and staff across 13 departments and 23 research centers.

== Mount St. Mary's University ==
In the summer of 2016 Trainor was selected as Mount St. Mary's University's 26th interim president for a year and then permanently retained the position. During Trainor's leadership thus far, he has increased enrollment, championed three new academic programs, a variety of new academic leadership moves, an agreement with the local Frederick Community College, and secured a $1 million donation to create the Palmieri Center for Entrepreneurship.

== Personal life ==
Trainor is married to his West Point classmate, Colonel (retired) Donna Marie Brazil and they have three children.
