= Ramapo College =

Public college in Mahwah, New Jersey, US

Ramapo College of New Jersey
- Type: Public liberal arts college
- Established: 1969; 57 years ago
- Accreditation: MSCHE
- Academic affiliations: COPLAC; Sea-grant; Space-grant
- Endowment: $33.7 million (2025)
- President: Cindy Jebb
- Students: 5,732
- Undergraduates: 5,145
- Postgraduates: 587
- Location: Mahwah, New Jersey, United States
- Campus: 300 acres (120 ha); Large suburb
- Newspaper: Ramapo News
- Colors: Maroon and white
- Nicknames: Roadrunners; Rowdies
- Sporting affiliations: NCAA Division III - NJAC; Skyline; ECAC
- Mascots: Rocky; Ricky; Fledge
- Website: ramapo.edu

Ramapo College of New Jersey (RCNJ) is a public liberal arts college in Mahwah, New Jersey, United States. It is part of New Jersey's public system of higher education. As of the fall 2021 semester, there were a total of 5,732 students enrolled at the college, including 576 graduate students and 11 doctorate students.

== History ==
In the late 19th century, the Ramapo Valley was developed for large estates by many wealthy families. Ramapo Valley is named after the Ramapough, a band of the Lenape Indians. Theodore Havemeyer and his family arrived in the area in the 1870s. Havemeyer, a founder of the American Sugar Company, purchased and renovated a home on the road that would become Route 202 and developed more than 1,000 acres (400 ha) surrounding the mansion into a farm. In 1889, he had a second mansion built on the property for one of his daughters. That mansion and about 700 acres (280 ha) of the original 1,000 were later purchased by Stephen Birch, president of the Kennecott Copper Company.

In 1968, the New Jersey Department of Higher Education authorized establishing a new state college in Bergen County, due to its increasing population and suburbanization. The criteria for the new college's location were sufficient land for the construction of current needs and future expansion, and proximity to at least one major highway. The locations of existing public and private institutions in the state were also taken into consideration. The college was planned to serve economically deprived students from urban and rural areas, in addition to a full range of middle-class families.

George Potter, an administrator at Grand Valley State University in Michigan, was appointed the first President of the college before a location had been determined. After many board meetings, it was decided that the former Birch Estate in Mahwah would be the location for the new college. Although the land was farther north than originally intended for the campus, its proximity to Route 17 and mountainous surroundings made it an attractive site. The architects drew up plans for an L-shaped, glass-walled facility consisting of five two-story academic buildings connected by large entry spaces, with each building devoted to a particular department or division. The architects recommended this approach to allow for rapid construction of additional wings onto the various entry spaces, allowing quick expansion of the college.

The former Havemeyer mansion was adapted as the president's house, and the former Birch Mansion was renovated to be used as the administration building of the college.

== Academics ==
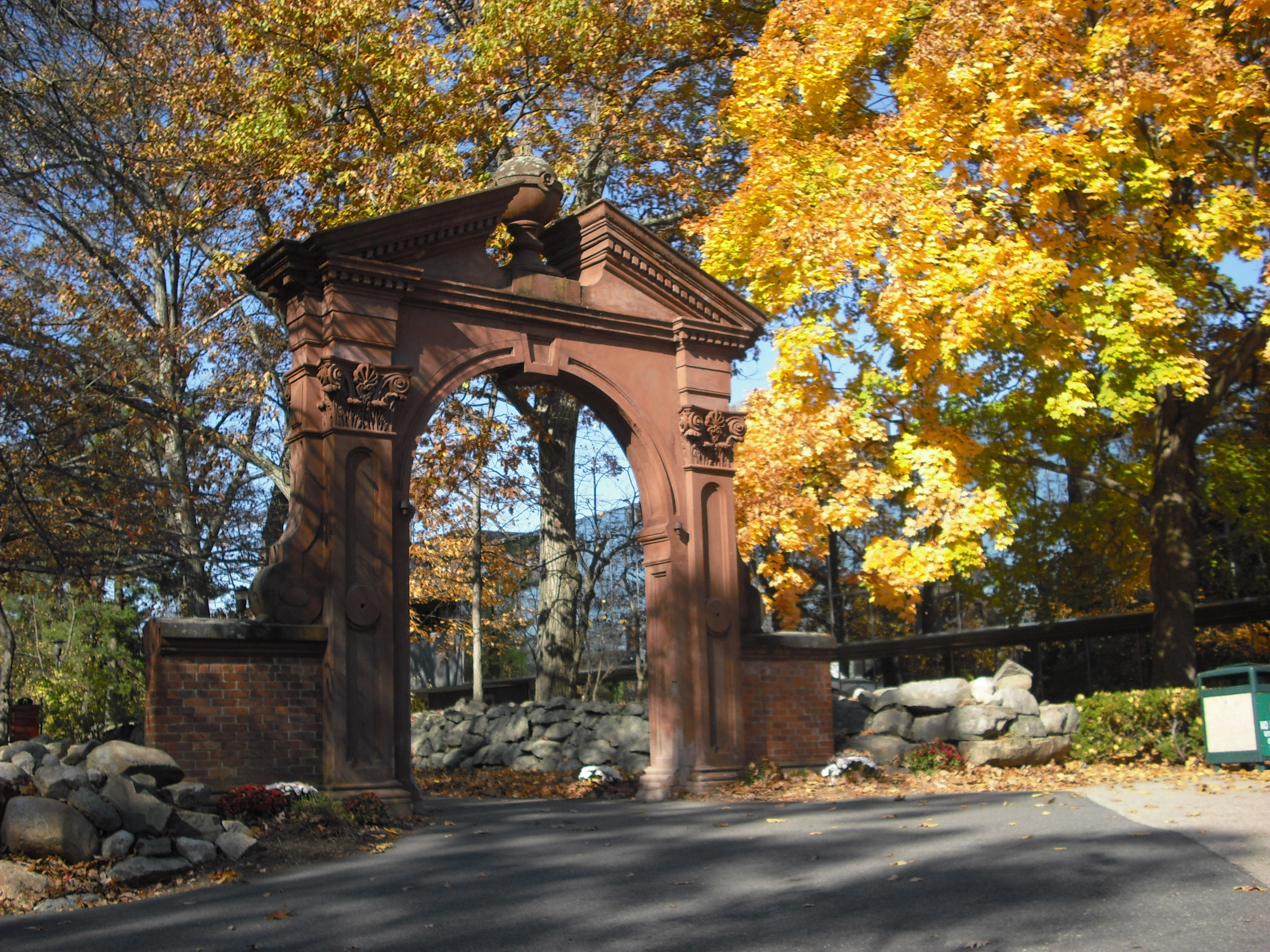
Ramapo College arch

Ramapo College offers bachelor's degrees in the arts, business, the social and natural sciences, and the humanities, as well as in professional studies programs such as nursing and social work. Eleven programs are offered leading to a master's degree: M.S. in Accounting (MSAC), M.S. in Data Science, Master of Business Administration (MBA), Master of Social Work (MSW), M.S. in Applied Mathematics (MSAM), Master of Science in Educational Technology (MSET), Master of Arts in Special Education (MASE), M.S. in Nursing (MSN), and a Master of Science in Accounting (MSAC). The college also offers a physician assistant (B.S./M.S.) and physical therapy (B.S./D.P.T.) with the University of Medicine and Dentistry of New Jersey; a B.A./Master's degree program in Art Therapy with Caldwell University; a B.S./Doctor of Chiropractic with New York Chiropractic College; a B.S./D.D.S. and a B.S./D.M.D. with the Rutgers School of Dental Medicine; a B.S./Doctor of Optometry (O.D.) with SUNY State College of Optometry; and a B.S./Doctor of Podiatric Medicine through New York College of Podiatric Medicine (NYCPM).

The campus is organized into four main schools, including the Anisfield School of Business; School of Arts, Humanities, and Education; School of Science, Nursing, and Health; and School of Social Sciences and Social Work as well as the Office of Undergraduate Studies & Honors.

The Investigative Genetic Genealogy Center, which opened in December 2022, provides assistance to law enforcement in solving cases including identification of human remains and determination of wrongful convictions, and offers a certificate program.

=== Accreditation ===
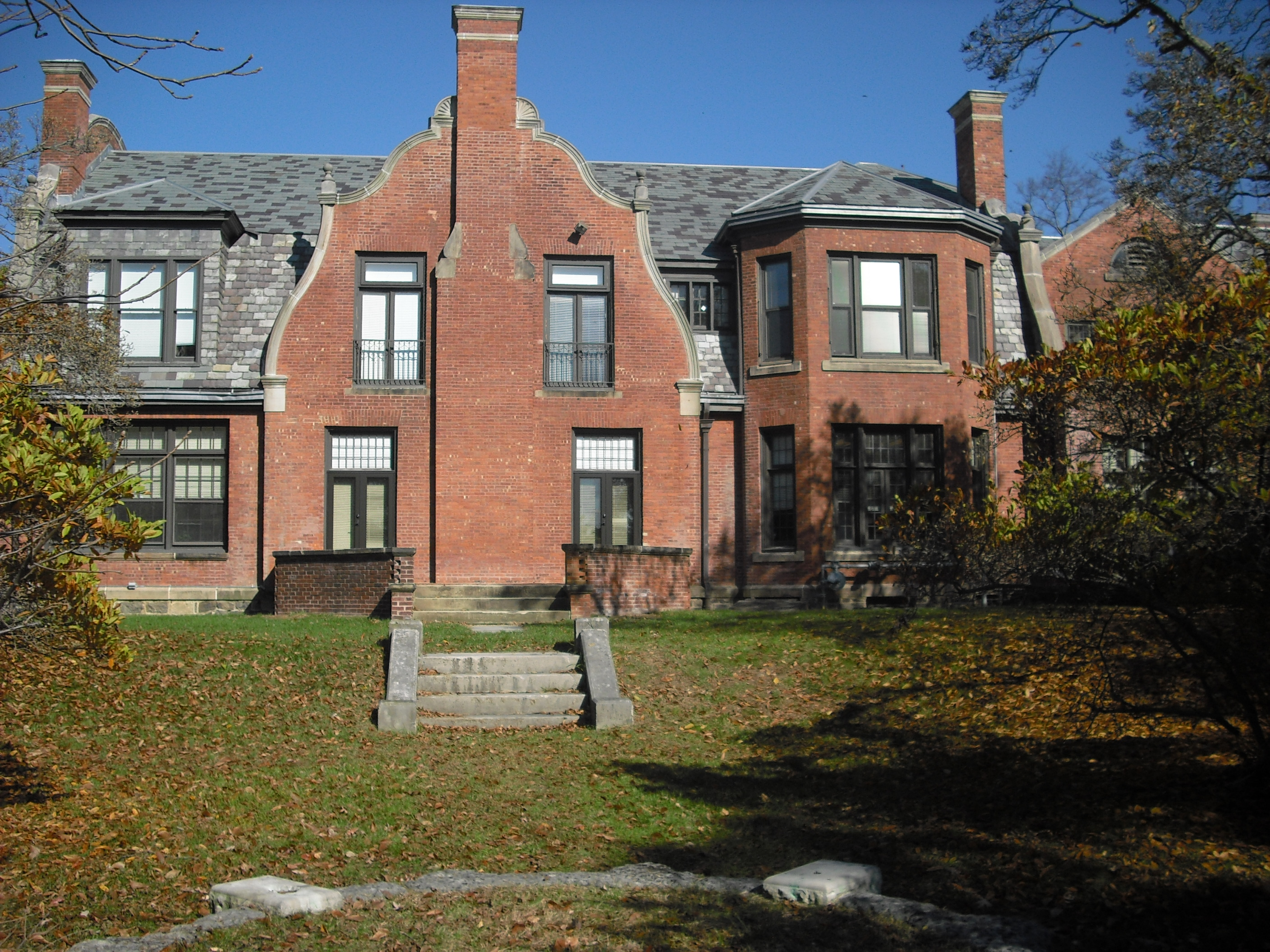
The administration building at Ramapo College, built in 1889, was formerly Birch Mansion

Ramapo College was established in 1968 as a state-supported, co-educational, four-year College for liberal arts, sciences, and professional studies. Ramapo received accreditation from the Middle States Association of Colleges and Schools in 1975. Individual programs also received accreditation. The Social Work Program is accredited by the Council on Social Work Education, the Chemistry Program is approved by the American Chemical Society (ACS), the Nursing Program is accredited by the National League for Nursing Accrediting Commission (NLNAC) and the New Jersey Board of Nursing, the Teacher Certification program is approved by the Teacher Education Accreditation Council (TEAC) and the State of New Jersey, and the Anisfield School of Business is accredited by the Association to Advance Collegiate Schools of Business (AACSB).

Ramapo College is also a founding member of the Council of Public Liberal Arts Colleges.

=== Rankings ===
U.S. News & World Report ranks Ramapo 37th among 196 "Regional Universities in the North" in its 2018 list.

Forbes ranked Ramapo College 299th out of the top 500 rated private and public colleges and universities in America for the 2024-25 report. Ramapo college was also ranked 140th among public colleges and 102nd in the northeast. In 2019, Forbes ranked Ramapo College at #341 in Top Colleges, #116 in Public Colleges, and #133 in the Northeast region, and ranked Ramapo at #206 in America's Best Value Colleges of 2019.

In 2023, Ramapo College's Nursing School was one of 17 New Jersey graduate schools to rank nationally, according to the U.S. News & World Report. The same article noted that Ramapo College is additionally ranked by U.S. News as the No. 2 public institution in New Jersey.

For its 2025 edition of "Best Colleges," U.S. News & World Report ranked Ramapo College as the 27th best in "Regional Universities North" (tied), 10th best in "Top Public Colleges," and 72nd in "Best Value Schools," marking an increase in all three rankings from previous editions.

SmartAsset ranked Ramapo No. 6 on its 2026 list of "America's Best Value Small Colleges and Universities".

== Presidents ==
1. George T. Potter (1968–1985)
2. Robert A. Scott (1985–2000)
3. Rodney David Smith (2001–2004)
4. Peter Philip Mercer (2004–2021)
5. Cindy Jebb (2021–present)

== Campus ==
Undergraduate demographics as of Fall 2023
Race and ethnicity	Total
White	55%
Hispanic	25%
Asian	11%
Black	6%
Unknown	2%
International student	1%
Economic diversity
Low-income (Note: The percentage of students who received an income-based federal Pell grant intended for low-income students.)	28%
Affluent (Note: The percentage of students who are a part of the American middle class at the bare minimum.)	72%

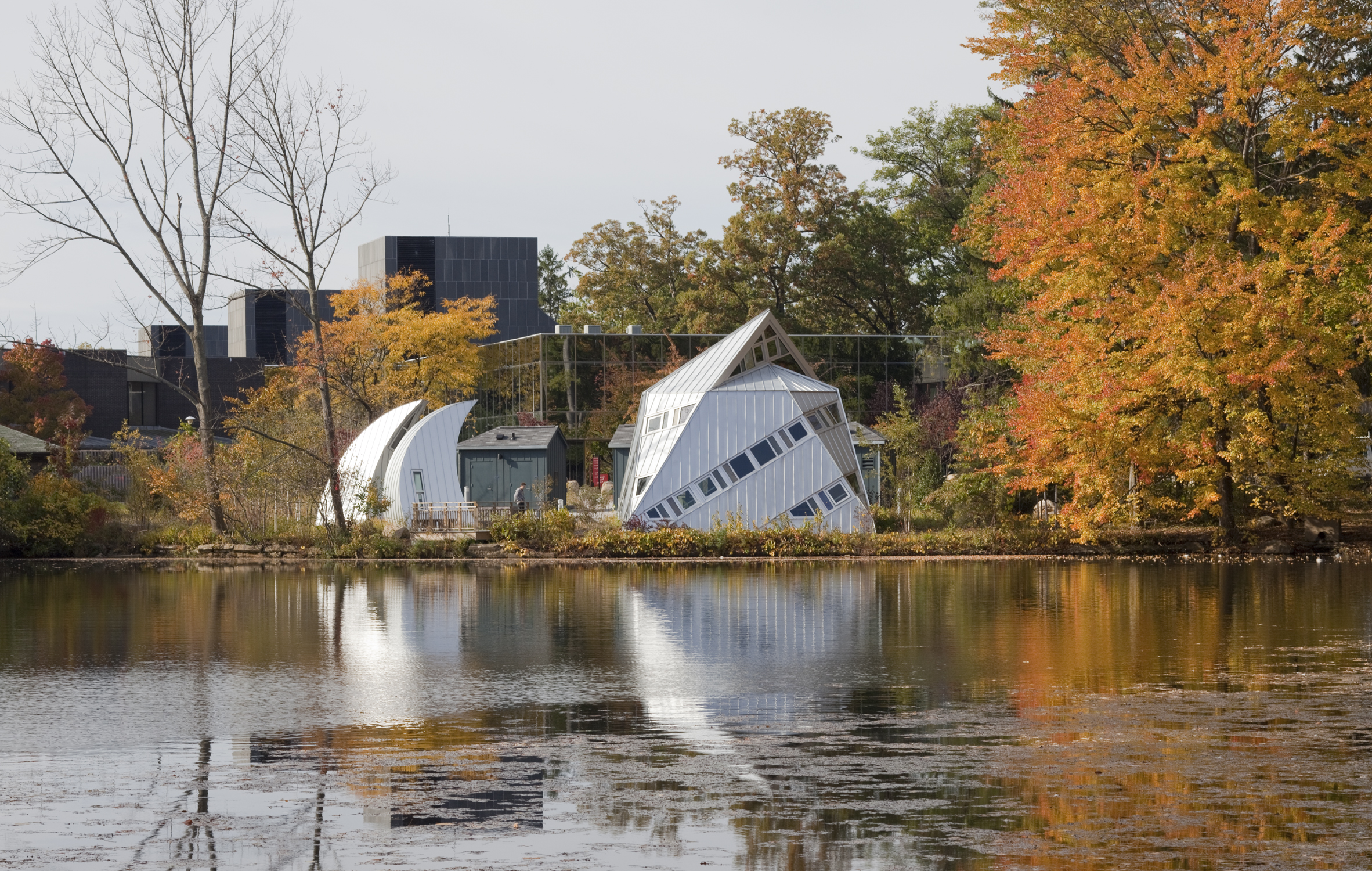
The Salameno Spiritual Center in front of the C-Wing Academic Building at Ramapo College

Praised for its accessibility and modernity which is juxtaposed by the picturesque outdoors, Ramapo College, which lies at the foothills of the Ramapo Mountains, was named by CondeNast Traveler as one of the 50 Most Beautiful College Campuses in America in 2020.

The 300-acre (120 ha) campus includes dozens of modern academic buildings, offices, eating facilities, and athletic playing fields and gyms. It also features an array of theaters and art galleries. Several dormitories have been built in the last twenty years. There is a "Spiritual Center" (see picture).

The school has an independent FM radio station, WRPR, 90.3 FM, a free-form station featuring numerous genres and talk shows.

== Athletics ==
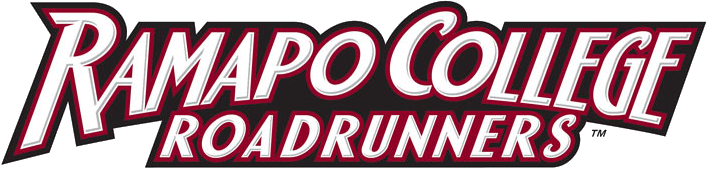
Ramapo athletics wordmark

Ramapo College teams are named the Roadrunners. The university has 8 men's teams and 12 women's teams, and participates in NCAA Division III sports. Men's sports include baseball, basketball, cross country running, soccer, swimming, track and field, and volleyball. Women's athletic teams at Ramapo College consist of basketball, cheerleading, cross country running, dance, field hockey, lacrosse, soccer, softball, swimming, track and field, and volleyball. Ramapo also offers a club DIII ice hockey team.

The men's basketball team won the 2017 New Jersey Athletic Conference (NJAC) championship and advanced to the NCAA Division III playoffs. However, Ramapo was eliminated after the second round of playoff competition.

The hockey team won the Metropolitan Collegiate Hockey Conference title for 2016–2017 season.

Student supporters of Ramapo College's athletic teams are known as the Ramapo Rowdies.

=== Affiliations ===
- NCAA Division III, ECAC
- New Jersey Athletic Conference (NJAC)
- North East Collegiate Volleyball Association (NECVA)
- Skyline Conference
- Metro (NCAA Men's Volleyball Championship Division III)

== Notable alumni ==
- Lauren H. Carson (born 1954), member of the Rhode Island House of Representatives, representing the 75th District since 2015
- Frank Eufemia (born 1959), former MLB relief pitcher who played with the Minnesota Twins
- Tim Eustace (born 1956), one of New Jersey's first openly gay assemblymen, he represented the state's 38th Legislative District from 2012 to 2018
- Don La Greca (born 1968), sportscaster who is the co-host of The Michael Kay Show on ESPN New York
- Grace Helbig (born 1985), comedian, actress, New York Times bestselling author and creator and host of the web series It's Grace
- Ron Cephas Jones (1957–2023), Emmy Award-winning actor known for This is Us, Mr. Robot and Across The Universe
- Mark Leiter (born 1963), former MLB pitcher
- Todd Lowber (born 1982), former NFL/CFL professional football player, who was on the 2007 New York Giants championship team
- Joshua Orwa Ojode (1958–2012), Kenyan politician and assistant interior minister
- Laura-Ann Petitto (born c. 1954), cognitive neuroscientist and a developmental cognitive neuroscientist, known for her discoveries involving the language capacity of chimpanzees
- Jeff Phillips (born 1968), fitness trainer and former actor best known for his work on Guiding Light, As the World Turns and the 1996 film Independence Day
- Mike Roche, actor
- Kevin J. Rooney (born 1960), member of the New Jersey General Assembly representing the state's 40th Legislative District since 2016
- Jay Seals (born 1976), actor, known for his recurring role in the television drama Mad Men from 2010 to 2015
- Rich Skrosky (born 1964), football player and coach
- Patrick Stickles (born 1985), singer, guitarist, and songwriter in the band Titus Andronicus

== Notable faculty ==
- Murray Bookchin (1921–2006), political theorist, pioneer in the ecology movement and former faculty member
- James Hoch, (born 1967), poet and professor
- Thilmeeza Hussain (born 1978), Maldivian Ambassador to the United Nations (2019–present) and former adjunct professor
- Laura McCullough (born 1960), poet and former professor
- Murray Sabrin (born 1946), political candidate and author

== Demographics ==
Ramapo College of New Jersey CDP
- Census-designated place
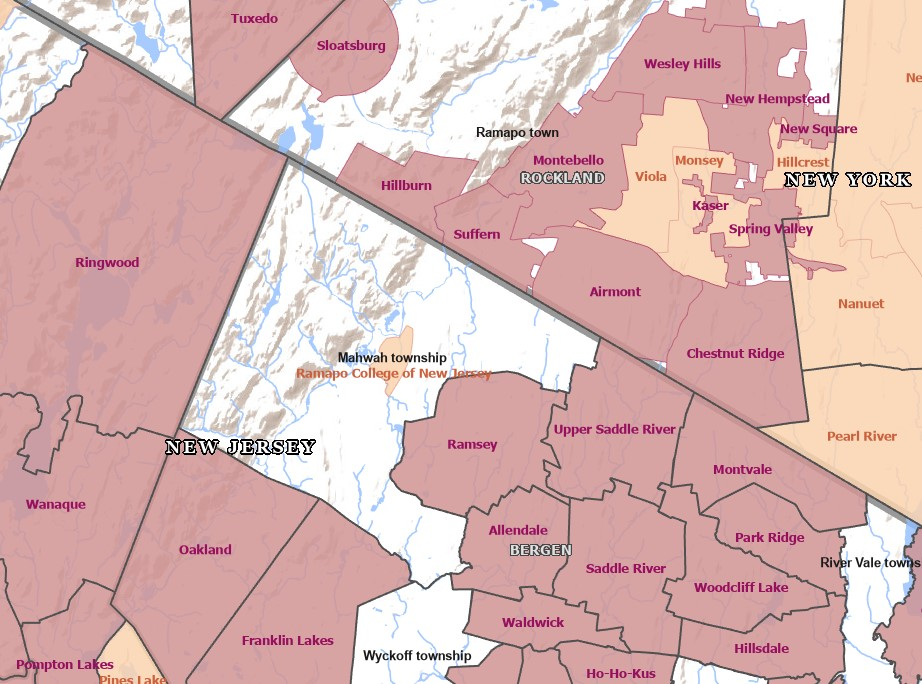

- Map of Ramapo College of New Jersey CDP in Bergen County (Inset: Location of Bergen County in New Jersey). Ramapo College of New Jersey CDP (New Jersey) Ramapo College of New Jersey CDP (the United States)
- Coordinates: 41°4′53″N 74°10′29″W
- Country: United States
- State: New Jersey
- County: Bergen
- Elevation: 1,010 ft (308 m)

Population (2020)
  - Total: 2,200
- Time zone: UTC−05:00 (Eastern (EST))
  - Summer (DST): UTC−04:00 (Eastern (EDT))
- FIPS code: 34-61632
- GNIS feature ID: 2806174

Ramapo College of New Jersey CDP is also a census-designated place (CDP) covering the Ramapo College campus in Mahwah.

It first appeared as a CDP in the 2020 U.S. census with a population of 2,200.

Historical population
Census	Pop.	Note	%±
2020	2,200		—
U.S. Decennial Census; 2020

=== 2020 census ===
Ramapo College of New Jersey CDP, New Jersey – Racial and ethnic composition Note: the US Census treats Hispanic/Latino as an ethnic category. This table excludes Latinos from the racial categories and assigns them to a separate category. Hispanics/Latinos may be of any race.
Race / Ethnicity (NH = Non-Hispanic)	Pop 2020	% 2020
White alone (NH)	1,461	66.41%
Black or African American alone (NH)	172	7.82%
Native American or Alaska Native alone (NH)	1	0.05%
Asian alone (NH)	207	9.41%
Native Hawaiian or Pacific Islander alone (NH)	1	0.05%
Other race alone (NH)	8	0.36%
Mixed race or Multiracial (NH)	41	1.86%
Hispanic or Latino (any race)	309	14.05%
Total	2,200	100.00%
