= Robert A. Scott =

American educator and academic administrator

9th President of Adelphi University
- In office July 1, 2000 – July 1, 2015
- Preceded by: Igor Webb; Steven Isenberg (interim)
- Succeeded by: Christine Riordan

2nd President of Ramapo College
- In office June 1, 1985 – June 30, 2000
- Preceded by: George T. Potter
- Succeeded by: Rodney David Smith

Personal details
- Education: Bucknell University (BA); Cornell University (PhD)
- Scientific career
- Fields: Higher Education

Robert Allyn Scott is an American educator and academic administrator who served as ninth president of Adelphi University located in Garden City, New York from 2000 to 2015.

== Biography ==
Robert Scott was a member of Bucknell University's class of 1961 with a B.A. in English and received his Ph.D. in Sociology and Organizational Ethnography from Cornell University. He started his career as a member of the Bucknell's Admissions staff in 1965. From 1969 to 1979, he worked at Cornell University, starting as Assistant Dean and then as Associate Dean and Senior Administrator of the College of Arts and Sciences. He was Assistant Commissioner and Director of Academic Affairs for the Indiana Commission for Higher Education from 1979 to 1985 and was selected as the president of Ramapo College in 1985. He served in that position until he was named the ninth president of Adelphi University in 2000. He retired from the Adelphi presidency in July, 2015.

Scott received numerous awards, including Bucknell's Alumni Association Award for Achievement in a Chosen Profession in 1991. He also received an honorary Doctor of Humane Letters from Ramapo College of New Jersey.
