= Silo (library) =

- Filename extension: .silo
- Developed by: Lawrence Livermore National Laboratory
- Latest release: 4.12.0; November, 2025
- Type of format: scientific data format
- Website: wci.llnl.gov/simulation/computer-codes/silo

Silo is a computer data format and library developed at Lawrence Livermore National Laboratory (LLNL) for storing rectilinear, curvilinear, unstructured, or point meshes in 2D and 3D. It supports data upon those meshes, including scalar, vector, and tensor variables; volume fraction-based materials; and mass fraction-based species. It fully supports block structured adaptive mesh refinement (AMR) meshes by way of mesh blocks structured in a hierarchy. Silo sits on top of other low-level storage libraries such as PDB, NetCDF, and HDF5.

Currently, VisIt, an open source software package with its start at LLNL, supports the Silo format for visualization and analysis, among many other formats. As of Version 4.8, July, 2010, the Silo source code is now available under the standard BSD Open Source License. The source code for two compression libraries which have been part of previous releases of the Silo library is not available under the terms of the BSD Open Source license. These are the Hzip and FPzip compression libraries. For this reason, two different releases of the Silo source code are made available.
