= Cindy Jebb =

14th Dean of the United States Military Academy

Cindy R. Jebb
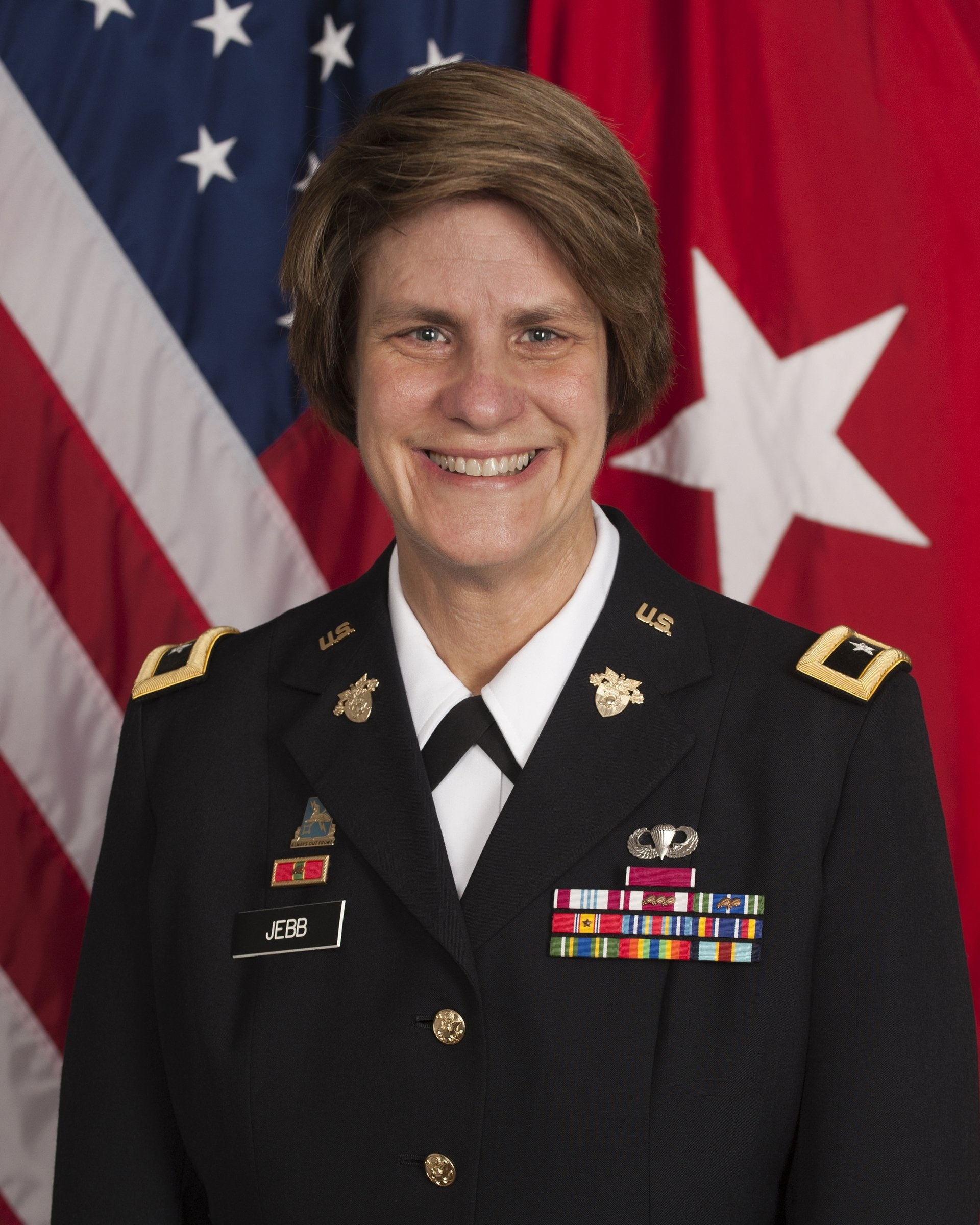

5th President of Ramapo College
- Incumbent
- Assumed office July 6, 2021
- Preceded by: Peter Philip Mercer

14th Dean of the United States Military Academy
- In office June 24, 2016 – May 28, 2021
- Preceded by: Timothy Trainor
- Succeeded by: Shane Reeves

Personal details
- Born: Cindy Rae Glazier New City, New York, U.S.
- Spouse: Joel Jebb
- Children: 3
- Education: United States Military Academy (BS); Duke University (PhD); Naval War College (MA)

Military service
- Allegiance: United States
- Branch/service: United States Army
- Years of service: 1982–2021
- Rank: Brigadier general
- Commands: Dean, United States Military Academy

Cindy R. Jebb (born Cindy Glazier) is a retired United States Army brigadier general whose final post was as the 14th dean of the United States Military Academy (West Point).

== Education ==
Jebb first attended West Point in 1978 and graduated in 1982 with a Bachelor of Science degree. She earned an MA in political science from Duke University in 1992 and a Ph.D. in political science in 1997. She earned an MA in national security and strategic studies from the Naval War College in 2000.

== Military career ==
In 1982, Jebb was commissioned as a military intelligence officer in West Point's Department of Social Sciences and went on to work in the National Security Agency (NSA). While in the NSA, she was part of the senior faculty as deputy commander of the 704th Military Intelligence Brigade. During 2000–2001, she was U.S. Military Academy Fellow Naval War College, teaching strategy and force planning. During 2006–2007, she was also a visiting fellow at the Pell Center.

=== Career at West Point ===
Jebb's earlier duties at the U.S. Military Academy (West Point) included her time from 2006 to 2009 as co-chair for West Point's Self-Study for the decennial Middle States Commission on Higher Education accreditation. She also became both professor and head of the academy's Department of Social Sciences. It was reported on June 16, 2016, that President Barack Obama appointed Colonel Jebb to the position of dean of West Point, replacing Brigadier General Timothy Trainor. She became the 14th dean at West Point, and the first female officer to hold the position. A week after her appointment, she was promoted to brigadier general on June 24.

She retired from military service and relinquished her position as dean to a newly promoted brigadier general, Shane Reeves, on May 28, 2021.

== Post-military career ==
=== Ramapo College of New Jersey ===
On March 5, 2021, it was announced that Jebb would be Ramapo College's fifth president, succeeding Dr. Peter Philip Mercer. She began as president on July 6, 2021.

== Personal life ==
Jebb is married to her academy classmate, Joel Jebb, with whom she has three children.
