= David E. Keyes =

David E. Keyes is a Senior Associate to the President of King Abdullah University of Science and Technology (KAUST) and the Director of the Extreme Computing Center at King Abdullah University of Science and Technology (KAUST). He was the inaugural Dean of the Division of Computer, Electrical, and Mathematical Sciences and Engineering (CEMSE) at KAUST and remains an adjunct professor in Applied Physics and Applied Mathematics at Columbia University and an affiliate of several laboratories of the U.S. Department of Energy. With backgrounds in engineering, applied mathematics, and computer science, he works at the algorithmic interface between parallel computing and the numerical analysis of partial differential equations, across a spectrum of aerodynamic, geophysical, and chemically reacting flows.

== Professional career ==
Keyes graduated summa cum laude in Aerospace and Mechanical Sciences from Princeton in 1978 and earned a doctorate in Applied Mathematics from Harvard University in 1984. He served on the faculties of Yale, Old Dominion, and Columbia Universities before taking up his current post in 2009. He is the author or editor of more than a dozen federal agency reports and member of several federal advisory committees on computational science and engineering and high performance computing. As of January 2022, his works have been cited 12180 times, and he has an h-index of 46.

== Manuscripts ==
- Hierarchical Algorithms on Hierarchical Architectures, D. Keyes, H. Ltaief & G. Turkiyyah, 2020, Phil. Trans. Royal Society, Series A 378:20190055.
- Batched QR and SVD Algorithms on GPUs with Applications in Hierarchical Matrix Compression, W. Boukaram, G. Turkiyyah, H. Ltaief & D. Keyes, 2018, Parallel Computing 74:19–33.
- A High Performance QDWH-SVD Solver Using Hardware Accelerators, D. Sukkari, H. Ltaief & D. Keyes, 2016, ACM Trans. Math. Software 43(1) 6:1–6:25.
- KBLAS: An Optimized Library for Dense Matrix-Vector Multiplication on GPU Accelerators, A. Abdelfattah, D. Keyes & H. Ltaief, 2015, ACM Trans. Math. Software 42(3) 18:1–18:31.
- Multicore-optimized Wavefront Diamond Blocking for Optimizing Stencil Updates, T. Malas, G. Hager, H. Ltaief, H. Stengel, G. Wellein & D. Keyes, 2015, SIAM J. Scientific Comput. 37:C439–C464.
- Field-split Preconditioned Inexact Newton, L. Liu & D. Keyes, 2015, SIAM J. Sci. Comput. 37:A1388-A1409.
- Multiphysics Simulations: Challenges and Opportunities, D. Keyes, L. C. McInnes, C. S. Woodward, et al., 2013, Int. J. High Perf. Comput. Applics. 27:5-83.
- Jacobian-Free Newton-Krylov Methods: A Survey of Approaches and Applications, 2004, D. A. Knoll & D. E. Keyes, J. Comp. Phys., 193:357–397.
- A Science-based Case for Large-scale Simulation, D. Keyes, editor-in-chief, Volume 1, 2003 and Volume 2, 2004, U.S. Department of Energy, http://www.pnl.gov/scales.
- Nonlinear Preconditioned Inexact Newton Algorithms, X.-C. Cai & D. Keyes, 2002, SIAM J. Sci. Comput. 24:183-200.

== Awards and honors ==
He was awarded an NSF Presidential Young Investigator Award in 1989. For his algorithmic influence in scientific simulation, Dr. Keyes was recognized as a Fellow of the Society for Industrial and Applied Mathematics, with the Sidney Fernbach Award of the IEEE Computer Society, and with ACM’s Gordon Bell Prize. In 2011, Dr. Keyes received the SIAM Prize for Distinguished Service to the Profession. In 2012 he became a fellow of the American Mathematical Society. Recently, Prof. Keyes has been elected a Fellow of the American Association for the Advancement of Science (AAAS)
