= Abraham H. Taub =

American mathematician (1911–1999)

Abraham Taub
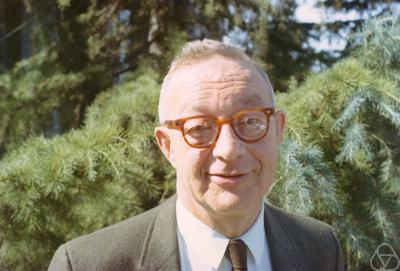
- Born: February 1, 1911; Chicago, Illinois, US
- Died: August 9, 1999 (aged 88)
- Education: University of Chicago; Princeton University
- Known for: Taub Adiabat
- Awards: Fellow of the APS (1941)
- Scientific career
- Fields: Mathematics; Physics
- Workplaces: University of Washington; University of Illinois at Urbana–Champaign; University of California, Berkeley
- Thesis: Quantum Equations in Cosmological Space (1935)
- Doctoral advisor: Howard P. Robertson
- Doctoral students: C. William Gear; Gene Golub

Abraham Haskel Taub (/tɔːb/; February 1, 1911 – August 9, 1999) was an American mathematician and physicist who made important contributions to the early development of general relativity, as well as differential geometry and differential equations.

== Education ==
Taub graduated in 1931 with a bachelor's degree in mathematics and physics from the University of Chicago. He earned his doctorate at Princeton University in 1935, under the direction of the prominent relativist Howard P. Robertson. At Princeton, Taub collaborated with Walker Bleakney and John von Neumann on terminal ballistics and shock waves during WWII, and was also influenced by Oswald Veblen. After a postdoctoral year at the Institute for Advanced Study, Taub became an assistant professor at the University of Washington in Seattle.

== Career ==
In a 1948 paper dealing with relativistic shock waves, Taub introduced a relativistic generalization of the Rankine-Hugoniot jump conditions across a shock, which is now known as the Taub Adiabat. He also introduced the Taub–NUT space in general relativity.

In 1948, Abe Taub went to the University of Illinois as the chief mathematician associated with a project to build a computer based on von Neumann's plans. The computer, called ORDVAC, was completed in 1952 and delivered to the Aberdeen Proving Ground. A second copy of the computer, ILLIAC I, remained at Illinois and was the prototype for several other computers. Taub was head of the Digital Computer Laboratory at Illinois from 1961 until 1964, when he moved to the University of California, Berkeley, as director of the Computer Center (1964–68) with a joint appointment in the department of mathematics. He was a full-time professor of mathematics from 1967 to 1978, when he retired as professor emeritus.

== Death ==
Upon his death he was survived by his widow, three children, and a grandchild.

== Selected publications ==
- Taub, A. H. (1991). "Interaction of dust clouds fronted by impulsive plane waves". J. Math. Phys. 32 (5): 1322. Bibcode:1991JMP....32.1322T. doi:10.1063/1.529332.
- Tipler, Frank, ed. (1980). Essays in general relativity : a festschrift for Abraham Taub. New York: Academic Press. ISBN 0-12-691380-3.
- Taub, A. H. (1980). "Space-times with distribution-valued curvature tensors". J. Math. Phys. 21 (6): 1423–1431. Bibcode:1980JMP....21.1423T. doi:10.1063/1.524568.
- Taub, A. H. (1971). "Relativistic Hydrodynamics". In A. H. Taub (ed.). Studies in Applied Mathematics. Englewood Cliffs, N. J.: Mathematical Association of America. pp. 235–263. LCCN 74-168565.
- Taub, A. H. & Fernbach, S. (1970). Computers and their role in the physical sciences. New York: Gordon and Breach. ISBN 0-677-14030-4.
- Taub, A. H. (1951). "Empty space-times admitting a three parameter group of motions". Ann. Math. 53 (3). The Annals of Mathematics: 472–490. doi:10.2307/1969567. JSTOR 1969567.
- Taub, A. H. (1940). "The acceleration of the Dirac electron". In Ballantine, J. P. (ed.). Six studies in mathematics. Seattle: University of Washington Press. LCCN 40-028366.
