= Shane R. Reeves =

15th Dean of the United States Military Academy

Shane Reeves
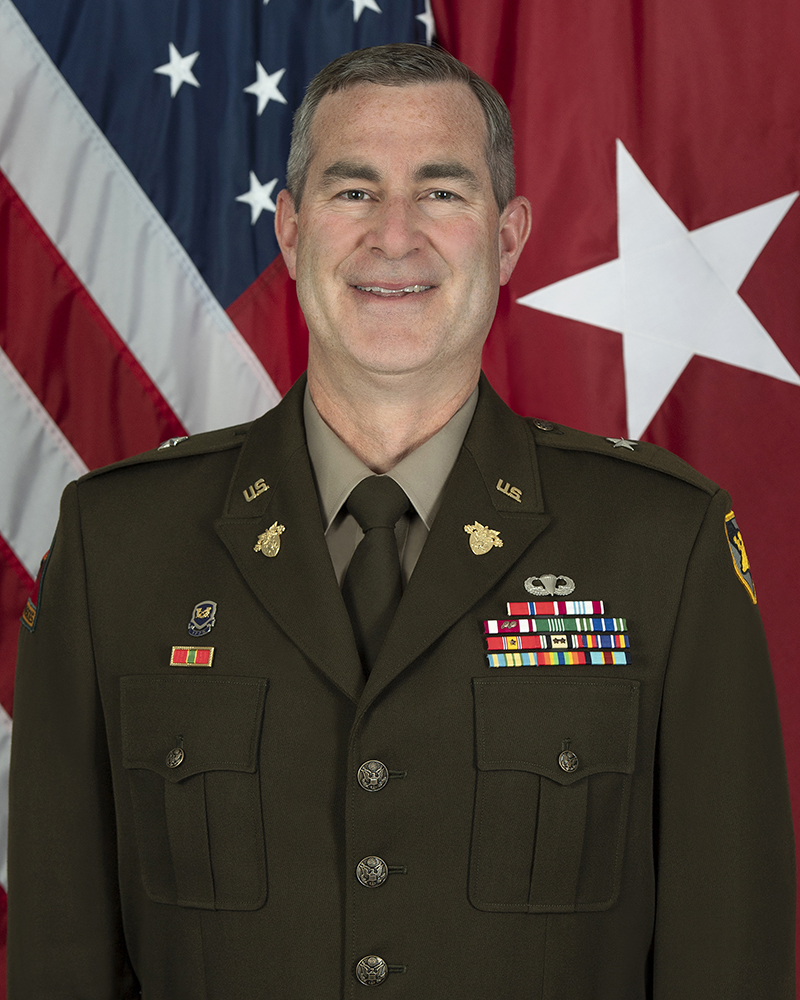

29th President of the University of Wyoming
- Incumbent
- Assumed office July 1, 2026
- Preceded by: Ed Seidel

15th Dean of the United States Military Academy
- In office May 28, 2021 – June 10, 2026
- Preceded by: Cindy Jebb
- Succeeded by: Nicholas Gist

Personal details
- Born: Shane Richardson Reeves
- Education: United States Military Academy (BS); College of William and Mary (JD); Judge Advocate General's Legal Center and School (LLM)
- Awards: Bronze Star

Military service
- Allegiance: United States
- Branch/service: United States Army
- Years of service: 1996–2026
- Rank: Brigadier General

Shane Richardson Reeves is a retired United States Army brigadier general who served as the 15th Dean of the United States Military Academy from 2021 to 2026. He is from Rock Springs, Wyoming and graduated from Rock Springs High School in 1992. He currently serves as the 29th President of the University of Wyoming since July 1, 2026.

== Military career ==
Reeves graduated from the West Point in 1996 with a Bachelor of Science degree and was commissioned as an armor officer. Upon graduation he served for four years at the Fort Irwin National Training Center in various positions. He subsequently became a part of the Judge Advocate General's Corps after graduating from law school at William & Mary in 2003. Later, Reeves served in numerous legal positions with the 1st Infantry Division, 1st Armored Division, The Judge Advocate General's Legal Center and School, and Joint Special Operations Command. He also completed a Master of Laws degree in military justice at The Judge Advocate General's Legal Center and School in 2008.

=== Career at West Point ===
Since 2011, Reeves taught in United States Military Academy’s Law Department. Where in 2015 he became deputy department head, and later department head in 2020. In this capacity Reeves also founded and was the inaugural director of the Lieber Institute for Law and Land Warfare. On May 28, 2021, Reeves succeeded Cindy Jebb as the Dean.

== Post-military career ==
=== University of Wyoming ===
On April 2, 2026, it was announced that Reeves will be the 29th president of University of Wyoming in July 2026. He began as President on July 1, 2026.

== Personal life ==
Reeves is married and has three children. He is admitted to practice law before the Virginia State Bar, the United States Court of Appeals for the Armed Forces, and the United States Supreme Court.
