= Sidney Fernbach =

American physicist

Sidney Fernbach (1917, Philadelphia, Pennsylvania - 1991) was an American physicist.

== Life ==
Fernbach studied physics at Temple University and the University of California, Berkeley. He worked as a physicist in the USA. Starting in 1952, he worked at the University of California Radiation Laboratory using computers to research nuclear weapons. He was the originating editor of the book series Methods in Computational Physics and also of The Journal of Computational Physics. In 1992, the Sidney Fernbach Award was established after his death.

== Awards ==
- 1987: W. Wallace McDowell Award

== Works ==
- Fernbach, Sidney & Taub, A.H. (1970). Computers and their role in the physical sciences. New York: Gordon and Breach. ISBN 0-677-14030-4.
