= Christine Riordan =

American scientist and academic administrator

Christine M. Riordan
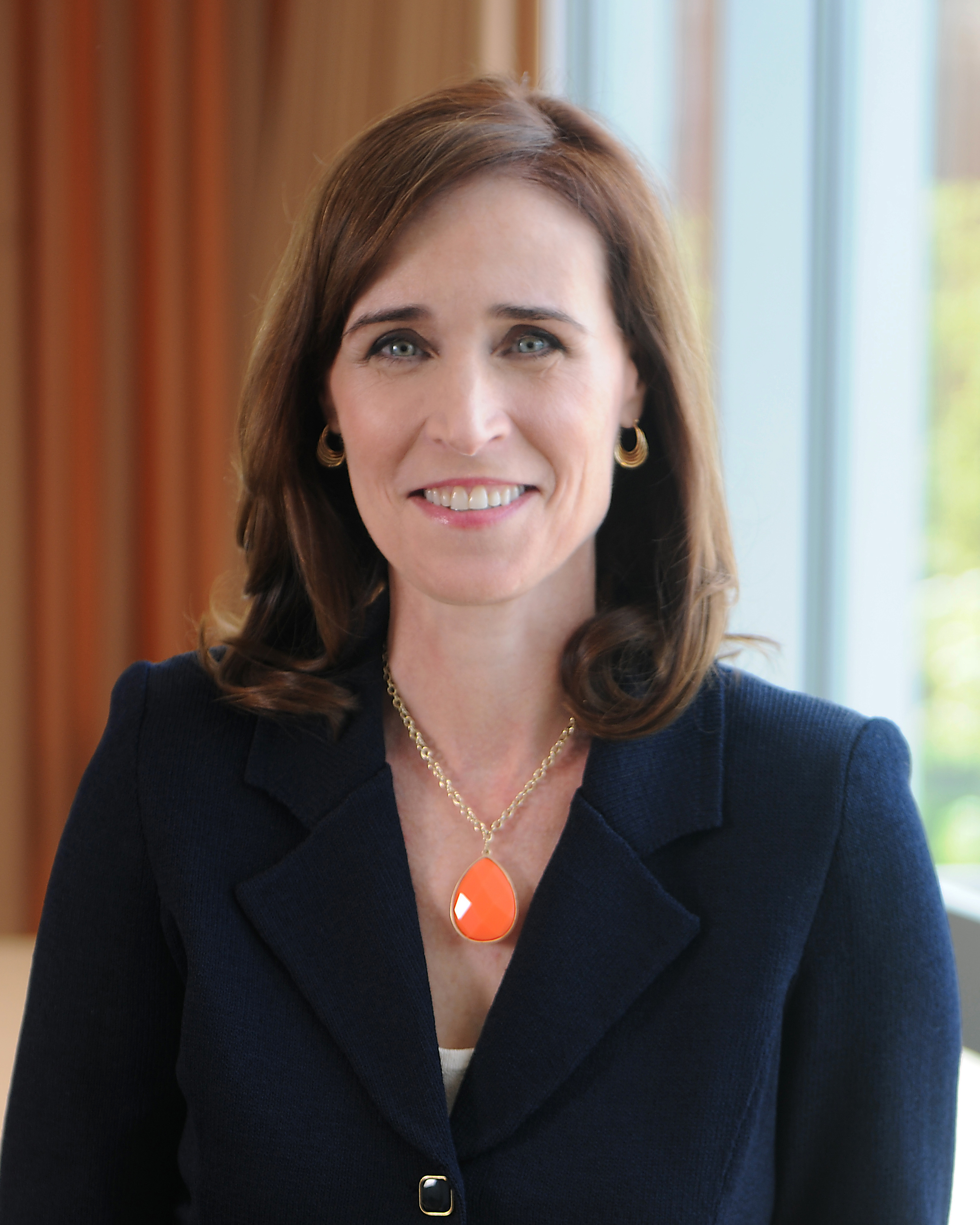
- Adelphi President Dr. Christine Riordan

10th President of Adelphi University
- In office July 1, 2015 – June 20, 2025
- Preceded by: Robert Allyn Scott

Personal details
- Education: Georgia Institute of Technology (BEng); Georgia State University (MBA, PhD)

Christine M. Riordan is an academic administrator and was the 10th president of Adelphi University in New York from 2015 to 2025.

== Career ==
From 1995 to 2005, at the Terry College of Business at the University of Georgia, Riordan was the founding and managing director of the Institute for Leadership Advancement.

As associate dean for external relations and the Luther Henderson University Chair of Strategic Management and Leadership at the Neeley School of Business at Texas Christian University from 2005 to 2008, Riordan was responsible for the functions of marketing, public relations, alumni relations, executive education and student leadership programs. Additionally, she served as the business school liaison to develop the university’s new interdisciplinary TCU Energy Institute.

Riordan served as dean of the Daniels College of Business at the University of Denver (DU) from 2008 to 2013. From 2013 to 2015, Riordan was provost at the University of Kentucky, where she oversaw all academic operations.

=== President of Adelphi University ===
Riordan was president of Adelphi University from July 1, 2015 to June 20, 2025 and the first woman to serve in the position. In Riordan’s first year she held a "100-Day Listening Tour", during which she met with students, faculty, and staff to learn about the university’s strengths and areas of potential growth. This became the foundation for the university's first strategic plan, Momentum.

Riordan served on governing or advisory boards for Adelphi University, Commission for Independent Colleges and Universities in New York, Long Island Regional Council for Higher Education, RE/MAX Holdings, Inc, and Long Island Association.

=== DUI ===
She was charged with driving drunk and crashing at a Long Island Rail Road station in September 2025.

== Awards ==
- Long Island Press Power List of the 50 most influential people on Long Island (2016) (2017) (2018)
- Bethpage Best of Long Island Awards Best College President (2017)
- Advancement for Commerce, Industry & Technology (ACIT) Monsignor Hartman Humanitarian Award (2017)
- Premier Business Woman of Long Island (2019)

== Publications ==
Riordan's written work has been distributed in the Harvard Business Review, Forbes, CNN, and Politico.
