= John B. Bell (mathematician) =

American mathematician

- Education: Cornell University (Ph.D., M.S.) Massachusetts Institute of Technology (B.S.)
- Known for: Advanced computational techniques for PDE-based applications Adaptive mesh refinement
- Awards: Elected National Academy of Sciences (2012); SIAM/ACM prize (2003); Sidney Fernbach Award (2005); SIAM Fellow (2009)
- Scientific career
- Fields: Mathematics; Scientific computing
- Workplaces: Lawrence Berkeley National Laboratory
- Doctoral advisor: Lawrence Payne

John B. Bell is an American mathematician now retired from the Lawrence Berkeley National Laboratory. He has made contributions in the areas of finite difference methods, numerical methods for low Mach number flows, adaptive mesh refinement, interface tracking and parallel computing. He has also worked on the application of these numerical methods to problems from a broad range of fields, including combustion, shock physics, seismology, flow in porous media and astrophysics.

== Career ==
Bell received his Ph.D. from Cornell University in 1979. Following a three-year stint at the Naval Surface Weapons Center, he spent four years at Exxon Production Research, where he was the group leader of the Applied Mathematics Group in the Long Range Research Division. He worked at Lawrence Livermore National Laboratory from 1986 until 1996, when he joined Lawrence Berkeley National Laboratory. He was the group lead of the Center for Computational Sciences and Engineering before becoming the Chief Scientist in LBNL's Computational Research Division of the Computing Sciences Area. He was one of the founders and the managing editor of Communications in Applied Mathematics and Computational Science (CAMCOS).

== Awards and honors ==
In 2018, Bell received the Berkeley Lab Prize Lifetime Achievement Award for "intellectual and strategic leadership in applied mathematics at LBNL, and for design and development of sophisticated numerical strategies to address critical scientific problems in support of DOE’s research missions.". In 2012, Bell was elected to the National Academy of Sciences. He is also a Fellow of the Society for Industrial and Applied Mathematics (SIAM). He is the recipient of the Sidney Fernbach Award from the IEEE Computer Society in 2005, given each year to one person who has made "an outstanding contribution in the application of high performance computers using innovative approaches. He also received the SIAM/ACM prize for computational science and engineering in 2003.
