= Heinz-Otto Kreiss =

German mathematician

- Born: 14 September 1930
- Died: 6 December 2015 (aged 85)

Academic background
- Education: KTH Royal Institute of Technology
- Thesis: Über die Lösung des Cauchyproblems für Lineare Partielle Differentialgleichungen mit Hilfe von Differenzengleichungen (1959)
- Doctoral advisor: Göran Borg

Academic work
- Institutions: Uppsala University; California Institute of Technology; University of California, Los Angeles
- Doctoral students: Björn Engquist; Bertil Gustafsson; Joseph Oliger; Erik Sandewall; Olof Widlund

Heinz-Otto Kreiss (14 September 1930 – 16 December 2015) was a German mathematician in the fields of numerical analysis, applied mathematics, and what was the new area of computing in the early 1960s. Born in Hamburg, Germany, he earned his Ph.D. at Kungliga Tekniska Högskolan in 1959. Over the course of his long career, Kreiss wrote a number of books in addition to the purely academic journal articles he authored across several disciplines. He was professor at Uppsala University, California Institute of Technology and University of California, Los Angeles (UCLA). He was also a member of the Royal Swedish Academy of Sciences. At the time of his death, Kreiss was a Swedish citizen, living in Stockholm. He died in Stockholm in 2015, aged 85.

Kreiss did research on the initial value problem for partial differential equations, numerical treatment of partial differential equations, difference equations, and applications to hydrodynamics and meteorology.

In 1974, he delivered a plenary lecture Initial Boundary Value Problems for Hyperbolic Partial Differential Equations at the International Congress of Mathematicians (ICM) in Vancouver. In 2002 he won the National Academy of Sciences Award in Numerical Analysis and Applied Mathematics. In 2003 he was the John von Neumann Lecturer of the Society for Industrial and Applied Mathematics (SIAM). He was elected a member of the American Academy of Arts and Sciences.

His doctoral students include Björn Engquist and Bertil Gustafsson. His daughter, Gunilla Kreiss, was a student of Engquist.

== Selected publications ==
- with Jens Lorenz: Initial-boundary value problems and the Navier-Stokes equations, Academic Press 1989, SIAM 2004
- with Hedwig Ulmer Busenhart: Time-dependent partial differential equations and their numerical solution, Birkhäuser 2001
- with Bertil Gustafsson, Joseph Oliger: time-dependent problems and difference methods, Wiley 1995
