= WRPR =

Campus-run radio station at Ramapo College

- Mahwah, New Jersey; United States
- Frequency: 90.3 MHz
- Branding: 90.3 FM Ramapo Radio

Programming
- Format: Freeform campus radio

Ownership
- Owner: Ramapo College of New Jersey

History
- First air date: July 7, 1980

Technical information
- Licensing authority: FCC
- Facility ID: 55029
- Class: A
- ERP: 100 watts
- HAAT: -20.0 meters
- Transmitter coordinates: 41°4′51.00″N 74°10′34.00″W

Links
- Public license information: Public file; LMS
- Website: WRPR Website

WRPR (90.3 FM) is a freeform campus radio station licensed to Mahwah, New Jersey and owned by Ramapo College. Its call letters were assigned on October 9, 1979, and it began broadcasting on July 7, 1980.

WRPR today can be heard on 90.3 FM in the Mahwah area, as well as on Ramapo College's closed-circuit-television system on channel 3 (campus events channel) and channel 10 (live video feed from the studio). To contact the station or chat with DJs, students and off-campus listeners send instant messages to the station via social media or call in.
