= Center for Computation and Technology =

Interdisciplinary research center in Louisiana, US

The Center for Computation and Technology (CCT) is an interdisciplinary research center at Louisiana State University in Baton Rouge, Louisiana. The center supports research involving computation, cyberinfrastructure, digital media and high-performance computing.

== History ==
The center developed from the Center for Applied Information Technology and Learning, also known as LSU CAPITAL. In 2003, LSU CAPITAL was integrated as a full LSU research center and renamed the Center for Computation & Technology.

Ed Seidel served as the center's first director. In 2008, Seidel left LSU after being selected to serve as director of the National Science Foundation's Office of Cyberinfrastructure. Stephen David Beck and Jorge Pullin later served as interim co-directors. Joel Tohline, who had been interim director of LSU CAPITAL, was named CCT director in 2010.

Faculty and staff associated with the center have included computer scientist Gabrielle Allen, Thomas Sterling, who was involved in the development of Beowulf cluster computing, and mathematician Susanne Brenner.

== High-performance computing ==
CCT has been associated with LSU's high-performance computing programs and cyberinfrastructure work. LSU's computing systems have included SuperMike, Tezpur, SuperMike-II and SuperMIC, all of which appeared in the TOP500 list of supercomputers.

SuperMike, introduced in 2002, was later replaced by Tezpur, a system expected to perform about 15 trillion operations per second compared with SuperMike's four trillion operations per second. Tezpur was listed by TOP500 in 2007 with 1,440 cores and an Rmax of 10,601.6 GFlop/s.

In 2013, the National Science Foundation awarded LSU's Center for Computation and Technology a $4 million grant to acquire SuperMIC, a supercomputing cluster capable of one quadrillion calculations per second. The system followed SuperMike, Tezpur and SuperMike II in LSU's supercomputing program.

CCT also has worked with HPC@LSU and the Louisiana Optical Network Infrastructure, known as LONI, which provides researchers access to high-performance computing resources at LSU and other Louisiana institutions.

== Digital arts and media ==
The center has also supported work in digital media and creative technology. Stephen David Beck and Stacey Simmons of CCT created the Red Stick International Animation Festival in 2005 to connect high-performance computing with computer animation and digital art. The festival later broadened into the Red Stick International Digital Festival, which CCT hosted in 2017.
