= Patrick Finnegan =

United States Army general (1949–2018)

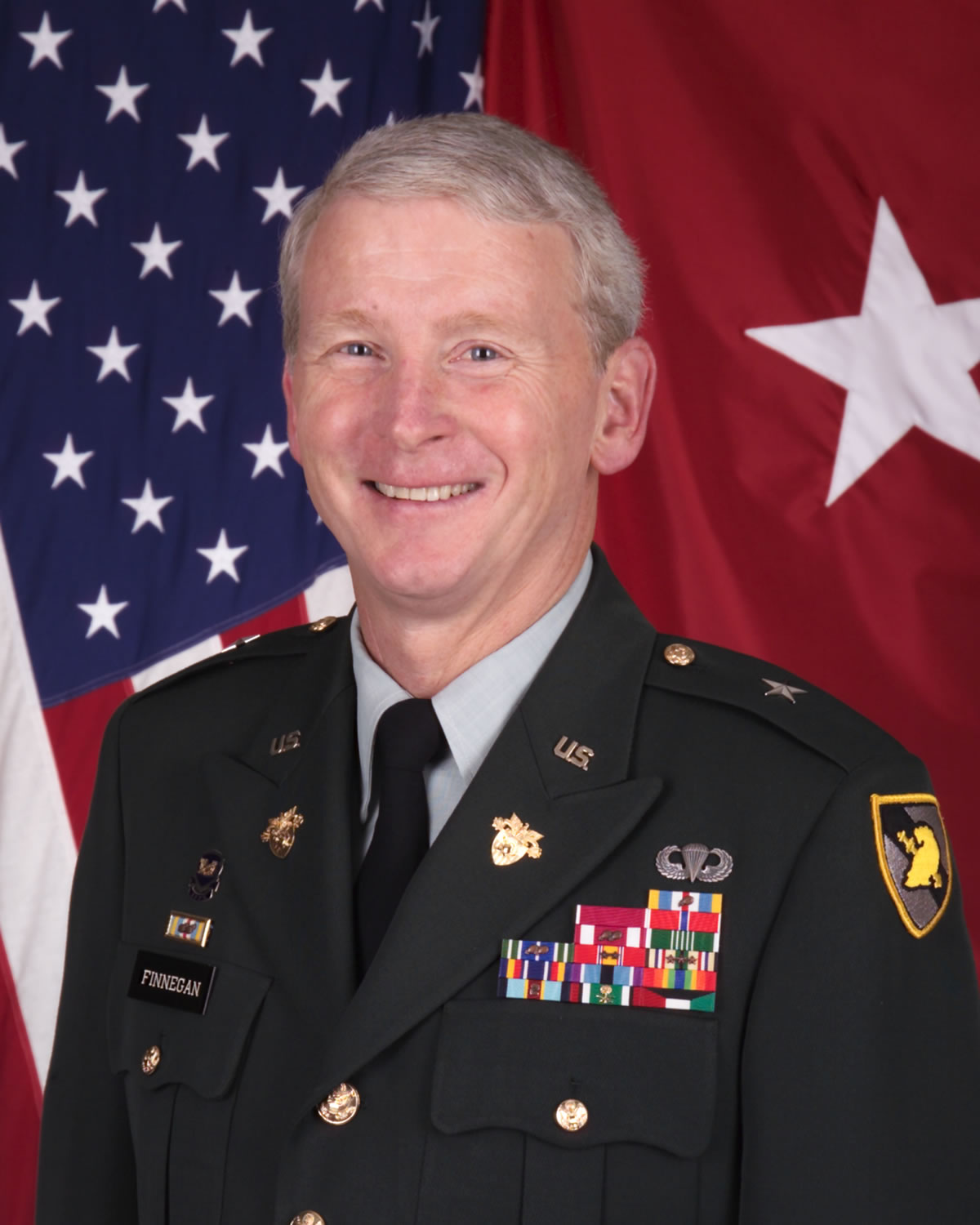
- General Finnegan's portrait while serving as West Point's Academic Dean in 2010

25th President of Longwood University
- In office October 22, 2010 – May 16, 2012
- Preceded by: Dr. Patricia Picard Cormier
- Succeeded by: W. Taylor Reveley IV

12th Dean of United States Military Academy
- In office July 1, 2005 – June 30, 2010
- Preceded by: Daniel J. Kaufman
- Succeeded by: Timothy Trainor

Personal details
- Born: September 20, 1949 Fukuoka, Japan
- Died: July 2, 2018 (aged 68)
- Cause of death: Heart attack
- Spouse: Joan
- Education: U.S. Military Academy (BS); Harvard University (MPA); University of Virginia (JD)

Military service
- Allegiance: United States
- Branch/service: United States Army
- Years of service: 1971–2010
- Rank: Brigadier General
- Commands: Dean of Academic Board, U.S. Military Academy
- Awards: Army Distinguished Service Medal; Defense Superior Service Medal (2); Legion of Merit; Bronze Star; Meritorious Service Medal (3)

Patrick Finnegan (September 20, 1949 – July 2, 2018) was a United States Army brigadier general, and the president of Longwood University. Finnegan served 39 years in the U.S. Army, retiring in 2010 after serving as the 12th dean of the Academic Board at the U.S. Military Academy. Following his Army career, he was appointed as the 25th president of Longwood University in 2010. Finnegan stepped down as president in 2012 for health reasons and returned to private life.

== Early life and family ==
Born in Fukuoka, Japan, to a military family, Finnegan spent most of his childhood moving across the globe. Finnegan's father, Col. John B. Finnegan, U.S. Army (Ret.), served in the Army for 32 years. Finnegan graduated from the Cardinal Gibbons School in Baltimore, Maryland, in 1967. Following high school, he attended the U.S. Military Academy in West Point, New York. While a cadet, Finnegan served as the chairman of the Honor Committee and manager of the Army Black Knights football team his senior year. Finnegan graduated from West Point in 1971 and commissioned as an officer in the U.S. Army.

== Army career ==
General Finnegan had a distinguished Army career, serving as an infantry, intelligence, and Judge Advocate General's Corps officer for over 39 years. Following graduation, Finnegan was selected to attend the John F. Kennedy School of Government at Harvard University where he earned a Master of Public Administration, graduating in 1973. After Harvard, Finnegan attended the infantry officer's basic course and graduated from Airborne School.

Finnegan's first assignment was 3rd Battalion Adjutant, 39th Infantry, 9th Infantry Division at Fort Lewis near Tacoma, Washington, from 1973 to 1974. Following Fort Lewis, he served as Headquarters Company Commander, U.S. Army Security Agency, Material Support Command at Vint Hill Farms Station in Virginia from 1975 to 1976. During this time, he was selected for the Army JAG Funded Legal Education Program, and was accepted to the University of Virginia School of Law in 1976. While a law student at UVA, Finnegan served as an editor of the Virginia Law Review and was selected to join the Order of the Coif. Finnegan graduated with a Juris Doctor in 1979.

Following law school, Finnegan served his initial JAG tour with the 8th Infantry Division in Bad Kreuznach, Germany, serving as trial counsel, Chief of Administrative Law, and Chief of Military justice between 1979 and 1982. In 1983, Finnegan was assigned to The Judge Advocate General's Legal Center and School in Charlottesville, Virginia, serving as a criminal law instructor and the deputy director of the Academic Department. In 1988, Finnegan served as the chief of administrative and civil law for XVIII Airborne Corps at Fort Bragg in North Carolina. During this assignment, Finnegan deployed in support of Operations Desert Shield and Desert Storm, serving as a staff judge advocate. In 1991, Finnegan served as a legal advisor to Commander and staff of Joint Special Operations Command at Fort Bragg. In 1994, he served as a staff judge advocate and legal advisor to the Commander, United States Special Operations Command (SOCOM) at MacDill AFB near Tampa, Florida. In 1996, Finnegan served as the principal legal advisor to the Supreme Allied Commander Europe, United States European Command in Stuttgart, Germany.

In 1998, Finnegan returned to his alma mater, the U.S. Military Academy, as the staff judge advocate. While at West Point, Finnegan was appointed the head of the Department of Law and served as a professor. In 2005, Finnegan was recommended and approved for the rank of brigadier general, to serve as the 12th dean of the Academic Board at West Point. While serving as the dean, Finnegan traveled to Hollywood with several FBI interrogators to voice concerns to the producers of the hit TV series 24. Finnegan expressed concerns that featuring torture on the TV series could damage the international image of the United States, and might sway public opinion in favor of torture as a tactic in war. Finnegan, along with several others at the meeting, urged the producers to limit the use of torture in the TV series. While serving as dean, West Point received numerous accolades, including being ranked the #1 Public College in the Nation by Forbes magazine and the best Public Liberal Arts College by the Princeton Review. Finnegan continued in his post as dean until he announced his retirement from active duty in 2010.

== President of Longwood University ==
In 2010, Longwood University announced it had selected Finnegan as the 25th president of the school. While serving as president, Finnegan undertook several initiatives that included the creation of an academic strategic plan that was collaborated campus-wide, securing Longwood University's membership in the NCAA Division I Big South Conference, and creating an Office of Sponsored Programs and Research to aide in funding for faculty research projects. In 2012, citing health reasons, Finnegan announced he would be stepping down as president.

== Death ==
In July 2018, Finnegan died of an apparent heart attack.

== Awards and decorations ==
U.S. military decorations
	Army Distinguished Service Medal
	Defense Superior Service Medal (with 1 bronze oak leaf cluster)
Width-44 crimson ribbon with a pair of width-2 white stripes on the edges	Legion of Merit
	Bronze Star
	Meritorious Service Medal (with 2 bronze oak leaf clusters)
Width-44 myrtle green ribbon with width-3 white stripes at the edges and five width-1 stripes down the center; the central white stripes are width-2 apart	Army Commendation Medal
Width-44 ribbon with two width-9 ultramarine blue stripes surrounded by two pairs of two width-4 green stripes; all these stripes are separated by width-2 white borders	Army Achievement Medal (with 2 bronze oak leaf clusters)
U.S. unit awards
	Joint Meritorious Unit Award (with 1 oak leaf cluster)
U.S. service (campaign) medals and service and training ribbons
Width=44 scarlet ribbon with a central width-4 golden yellow stripe, flanked by pairs of width-1 scarlet, white, Old Glory blue, and white stripes	National Defense Service Medal (with 2 service stars)
	Southwest Asia Service Medal (with 3 service stars)
	Global War on Terrorism Service Medal
	Humanitarian Service Medal
Width-44 ribbon with width-6 central ultramarine blue stripe, flanked by pairs of stripes that are respectively width-4 emerald, width-3 golden yellow, width-5 orange, and width-7 scarlet	Army Service Ribbon
Width-44 ribbon with width-8 central brick stripe, flanked by pairs of stripes that are respectively width-2 golden yellow, width-10 grotto blue, and width-6 national flag blue	Army Overseas Service Ribbon (with award numeral "2")
Foreign awards
	Kuwait Liberation Medal (Saudi Arabia)
	Kuwait Liberation Medal (Kuwait)
U.S. badges, patches and tabs
	Parachutist Badge
	XVIII Airborne Corps worn as his Combat Service Identification Badge
	Judge Advocate General's Corps, United States Army Regiment worn as his Distinctive Unit Insignia
	1 Overseas Service Bar
