= Robert J. Harrison =

American computer scientist

- Born: June 19, 1960 (age 66); Birmingham, England
- Education: University of Cambridge
- Known for: MADNESS, NWChem
- Scientific career
- Fields: Chemistry, Applied Mathematics, and Computer Science
- Doctoral advisor: Nicholas Handy

Robert J. Harrison (born June 19, 1960) is a distinguished expert in high-performance computing. He is a professor in the Applied Mathematics and Statistics department and Interim Executive Director of Empire AI and founding Director of the Institute for Advanced Computational Science at Stony Brook University with a $20M endowment. Through a joint appointment with Brookhaven National Laboratory, Professor Harrison has also been named Director of the Computational Science Center and New York Center for Computational Sciences at Brookhaven. Dr. Harrison comes to Stony Brook from the University of Tennessee and Oak Ridge National Laboratory, where he was Director of the Joint Institute of Computational Science, Professor of Chemistry and Corporate Fellow. He has a prolific career in high-performance computing with over one hundred publications on the subject, as well as extensive service on national advisory committees.

He has many publications in peer-reviewed journals in the areas of theoretical and computational chemistry, and high-performance computing. His undergraduate (1981) and post-graduate (1984) degrees were obtained at Cambridge University, England. Subsequently, he worked as a postdoctoral research fellow at the Quantum Theory Project, University of Florida, and the Daresbury Laboratory, England, before joining the staff of the theoretical chemistry group at Argonne National Laboratory in 1988. In 1992, he moved to the Environmental Molecular Sciences Laboratory of Pacific Northwest National Laboratory, conducting research in theoretical chemistry and leading the development of NWChem, a computational chemistry code for massively parallel computers. In August 2002, he started the joint faculty appointment with UT/ORNL, and became director of JICS in 2011.

In addition to his DOE Scientific Discovery through Advanced Computing (SciDAC) research into efficient and accurate calculations on large systems, he has been pursuing applications in molecular electronics and chemistry at the nanoscale. In 1999, the NWChem team received an R&D Magazine R&D100 award, in 2002, he received the IEEE Computer Society Sidney Fernbach Award, and in 2011 another R&D Magazine R&D100 award for the development of MADNESS. In 2015-2016, Dr. Harrison co-chaired with Bill Gropp the National Academies of Sciences, Engineering, and Medicine committee on Future Directions for NSF Advanced Computing Infrastructure to Support U.S. Science in 2017-2020.

His interests and expertise are in theoretical and computational chemistry, high-performance computing, electron correlation, electron transport, relativistic quantum chemistry, and response theory.

== Bibliography ==
1. Beylkin, Gregory; Fann, George; Harrison, Robert J.; Kurcz, Christopher; Monzón, Lucas (2012). "Multiresolution representation of operators with boundary conditions on simple domains" (PDF). Applied and Computational Harmonic Analysis. 33: 109. doi:10.1016/j.acha.2011.10.001.
2. Gothandaraman, Akila; Peterson, Gregory D.; Warren, G.L.; Hinde, Robert J.; Harrison, Robert J. (2008). "FPGA acceleration of a quantum Monte Carlo application". Parallel Computing. 34 (4–5): 278. doi:10.1016/j.parco.2008.01.009.
3. Sekino, Hideo; Maeda, Yasuyuki; Yanai, Takeshi; Harrison, Robert J. (2008). "Basis set limit Hartree–Fock and density functional theory response property evaluation by multiresolution multiwavelet basis". The Journal of Chemical Physics. 129 (3): 034111. Bibcode:2008JChPh.129c4111S. doi:10.1063/1.2955730. PMID 18647020.
4. Beste, Ariana; Meunier, Vincent; Harrison, Robert J. (2008). "Electron transport in open systems from finite-size calculations: Examination of the principal layer method applied to linear gold chains". The Journal of Chemical Physics. 128 (15): 154713. Bibcode:2008JChPh.128o4713B. doi:10.1063/1.2905219. PMID 18433264.
5. Hirata, So; Yanai, Takeshi; Harrison, Robert J.; Kamiya, Muneaki; Fan, Peng-Dong (2007). "High-order electron-correlation methods with scalar relativistic and spin-orbit corrections". The Journal of Chemical Physics. 126 (2): 024104. Bibcode:2007JChPh.126b4104H. doi:10.1063/1.2423005. PMID 17228940.
6. Gan, Zhengting; Grant, Daniel J.; Harrison, Robert J.; Dixon, David A. (2006). "The lowest energy states of the group-IIIA–group-VA heteronuclear diatomics: BN, BP, AlN, and AlP from full configuration interaction calculations". The Journal of Chemical Physics. 125 (12): 124311. Bibcode:2006JChPh.125l4311G. doi:10.1063/1.2335446. PMID 17014178.
7. Harrison, Robert J.; Fann, George I.; Yanai, Takeshi; Gan, Zhengting; Beylkin, Gregory (2004). "Multiresolution quantum chemistry: Basic theory and initial applications". The Journal of Chemical Physics. 121 (23): 11587–98. Bibcode:2004JChPh.12111587H. doi:10.1063/1.1791051. PMID 15634124.
