= Utah Governor's Medal for Science and Technology =

The Utah Governor's Medal for Science and Technology is the highest civilian award bestowed by the U.S. state of Utah in those fields. It is awarded in the five categories of academia, science education, industry, government, and a special category. The award was initiated in 1987 and is sponsored by the Utah Science and Technology Research Initiative and the Governor’s Office of Economic Development. Nominations are reviewed by the Utah State Science Advisory Council before being presented to the governor.

== Award winners ==
=== 1980s ===
1987

Academia:

- Del Allen, Brigham Young University
- Sidney R. Ash, Weber State College
- Wilford Hansen, Utah State University
- Eugene Loh, University of Utah
- James Mac Mahon, Utah State University
- William Odell, University of Utah
- Robert W. Parry, University of Utah
- Richard Riesenfeld, University of Utah
- John Roth, University of Utah
- L. Douglas Smoot, Brigham Young University
- Milton E. Wadsworth, University of Utah
- Homer F. Walker, Utah State University

Education:

- Richard Dix Cloward, Bonneville High School
- Shu Ming Chang, Clearfield High School
- Wade W. Gleary, Davis High School
- Rachelle Argyle, Park City High School
- Wendy Hendrickson, Richfield High School

Industry:

- David Evans, Evans & Sutherland
- Milton Lee, Lee Scientific
- Michael Alder, NPI
- Benjamin V. Cox, Unisys
- Wayne Brown, Utah Innovation Center

1988

Academia:

- Douglas Chabries, Brigham Young University
- Eldon Gardner, Utah State University
- William J. Higuchi, University of Utah
- Jack Keller, Utah State University
- Sung Wan Kim, University of Utah
- Carl D. Marti, Jr., Weber State College
- Don Olsen, University of Utah
- Robert W. Schunk, Utah State University
- Robert W. Sidwell, Utah State University

Education:

- Rober Cefalo, Box Elder High School
- RuthAnn Yahne, Layton High School
- David G. Rettie, Olympus High School
- Linda Jean Preston, Park City High School
- Merrill Webb, Provo High School

Industry:

- Alan Ashton, WordPerfect

1989

Academia:

- James W. Cronin, University of Utah
- Doran J. Baker, Utah State University
- Dean F. Peterson, Jr., Utah State University

Education:

- Pamela P. Giles, Brighton High School
- Gerald B. Lord, Granger High School

Industry:

- Robert A. Schumacker, Evans & Sutherland
- Aaron W. Farr, Jetway Systems
- Ronald K. Bell, Unisys

=== 1990s ===
1990

Academia:

- John A. Dixon, University of Utah
- Reed M. Izatt, Brigham Young University
- Stephen Jacobsen, University of Utah
- Fritz Luty, University of Utah
- Cyrus M. Mckell, Weber State College
- Ronald Ragsdale, University of Utah
- John Paul Riley, Utah State University

Education:

- Dwight O. Brown, Bountiful High School
- John W. Barainca, Brighton High School
- Michael B. Harris, Layton High School

Industry:

- Allan Steed, Space Dynamics Laboratory
- William Partridge, Technical Research Associates, Inc.

1991

Academia:

- Jerald Bradshaw, Brigham Young University
- J. Calvin Giddings, University of Utah
- Douglas James, Utah State University
- Verlaine McPhie, Salt Lake Community College
- Gilbert Moore, Utah State University
- Baldomero Olivera, University of Utah
- Frank Redd, Utah State University

Education: Marcie Wolfe, Mt. Ogden Middle School

Government:

- Gene Amman, United States Forest Service

Industry:

- Ruth Novak, Hercules Inc.

1992

Academia:

- Joseph Andrade, University of Utah
- A. Bruce Bishop, Utah State University
- Karin Caldwell, University of Utah
- David M. Grant, University of Utah
- Levi Hintze, Brigham Young University
- Bartell Jensen, Utah State University
- J. Bevan Ott, Brigham Young University
- Edward B. Walker, Weber State University

Education:

- Jan Vander Hooft, Brighton High School
- Larry Larson, North Cache Middle School
- Vern W. Bangerter, Timpview High School

Industry:

- Homer R. Warner, American College of Medical Informatics
- J.D. Mortensen, Midmid, Inc.
- Ray Noorda, Novell, Inc.

1993

Academia:

- K. L. DeVries, University of Utah
- Helga E. T. Kolb, University of Utah
- Ronald Sims, Utah State University
- Peter Stang, University of Utah
- Raymond L. White, University of Utah

Education:

- Larry J. Peterson, Bonneville High School
- LaMont Jensen, Clearfield High School

Government:

- Hellmut H. Doelling, Utah Geological Survey

Industry:

- J. McKay Anderson, Hercules, Inc.
- O. Lew Wood, Quartztronics, Inc.
- Raymond J. Ganowsky, Ram Company

1994

Academia:

- Tracy Hall, Brigham Young University
- Raymond Gesteland, University of Utah
- Sherman Coleman, University of Utah
- William Lee Stokes, University of Utah
- Linda Powers, Utah State University

Education:

- Ty Robinson, Spanish Fork Intermediate

Government:

- Kevin T. Jones, Division of Utah State History

Industry:

- Keith Wilson, Dynix
- Errol P. EerNisse, Quartztronics

1995

Academia:

- Peter F. Gerity, Utah State University
- David W. Pershing, University of Utah
- C. Dale Poulter, University of Utah
- Thomas G. Stockham, University of Utah

Education:

- Sherman Dickman, Salt Lake City School District

Government:

- Charles B. Hunt, U.S. Geological Survey

Industry:

- Mark Skolnick, Myriad Genetics

1996

Academia:

- C. Anthon Ernstrom, Utah State University
- Richard A. Normann, University of Utah
- Morris Robbins, Brigham Young University

Education:

- Walter Saunders, Utah State University

Government:

- Von Del Chamberlain, Hansen Planetarium
- Walter Arabasz, University of Utah

Industry:

- Dinesh Patel, TheraTech, Inc.
- Harold Ritchey, Thiokol
- Laurence Reaveley, University of Utah

1997

Academia

- Gerald B. Stringfellow, University of Utah

Education:

- Rose Marie Voce, Jackson Elementary

Industry:

- Bryant F. Anderson, Lockheed Martin
- Peter Meldrum, Myriad Genetics
- Dan Fischer, Ultradent Products, Inc.

1998

Academia:

- John O. Evans, Utah State University
- Spotswood Spruance, University of Utah

Education:

- Joseph Hugh Baird, Brigham Young University
- Duane Merrell, Emery High School

Government:

- David Madsen, Utah Geological Survey

Industry:

- David Burt, Space Dynamics Laboratory

1999

Academia:

- Christopher R. Johnson, University of Utah
- James Ehleringer, University of Utah
- Stephen M. Prescott, University of Utah
- Marvin N. Tolman, Brigham Young University ED
- Don Carl Smellie, Utah State University ED

Government:

- Eva C. Nieminski, Utah Department of Environmental Quality
- Alan J. Mohr, Dugway Proving Ground
- Bruce Barrett, U.S. Bureau of Reclamation

Industry:

- Robert F. Keller, Alliant Techsystems
- Marlin Shelley, Cirris Systems Corporation

=== 2000s ===
2000

Academia:

- Thomas Henderson, University of Utah
- William Carroll, University of Utah
- Gary Belovsky, Utah State University

Education:

- Richard Tolman, Brigham Young University
- Donald Burge, College of Eastern Utah
- Donald Jensen, Utah State University

Government:

- James Kohler, Bureau of Land Management
- Stanley Perkes, Bureau of Land Management
- James Bowers, Dugway Proving Ground
- Suzanne Winters, The Escalante Center

Industry:

- Gilson Newman Bingham Team: Bradley S. Gilson, Mark Newman, Judd Lawrence, Scott Hill
- James Boye, Varian Medical Systems

2001

Academia:

- Mary Beckerle, University of Utah
- Gail Bingham, Utah State University

Education:

- Janet Ross, Four Corners School

Government:

- Doyle Stephens, US Geological Survey

Industry:

- Bob Randolph, Alliant Techsystems

2002

Academia:

- Steven D. Aust, Utah State University
- Randall W. Burt, University of Utah
- Om P. Gandhi, University of Utah

Industry:

- Larry J. Ashton, Rocky Mountain Composites, Inc.
- Hunter Jackson, NPS Pharmaceuticals
- Bill Jordan Pope, Diamicron, Inc.

Education:

- Kathleen P. Ochsenbein, Roy Junior High School

Special:

- Mario Capecchi, University of Utah

2003

Academia:

- Clair Batty, Utah State University
- David Bowles, Utah State University
- Carl Wittwer, University of Utah

Education:

- Virgina Ord, Davis School District
- William Smith, Granite School District

Government:

- Jerry Miller, US Bureau of Reclamation
- Brett Moulding, Utah State Office of Education

Industry:

- Fred Lampropoulos, Merit Medical Systems, Inc.
- Ashok Joshi, Ceramatec, Inc.

2004

Academia:

- A. Lorris Betz, University of Utah
- Noelle E. Cockett, Utah State University
- Karl Gordon Lark, University of Utah
- Joel S. Miller, University of Utah
- C. Arden Pope, Brigham Young University
- Wynn R. Walker, Utah State University

Education:

- Richard Halterman, Granite School District

Government:

- Michael Glass, Dugway Proving Ground

Industry:

- Stephen R. Carter, Novell, Inc.

Special:

- Rex S. Spendlove, HyClone

2005

Academia:

- David W. Hoeppner, University of Utah
- Daniel L. Simmons, Brigham Young University
- Z. Valy Vardeny, University of Utah

Education

- Barbara Gentry, Jordan School District
- Donna Lee Trease, Davis County School District

Government:

- Loren Morton, Utah Department of Environmental Quality

Industry:

- Dean Lester, ATK Thiokol
- James LeVoy Sorenson, Sorenson Companies

Special:

- Richard K. Koehn, SentrX Surgical, Inc.
- Richard W. Grow, University of Utah

2006

Academia:

- Merrill W. Beckstead, Brigham Young University
- Jan D. Miller, University of Utah
- Pierre Sokolsky, University of Utah
- Anil Virkar, University of Utah

Education:

- Gina Sanzenbacher, Jordan Applied Technology Center

Government:

- Theron Miller, Utah Department of Environmental Quality

Industry:

- Glenn D. Prestwich, Carbylan BioSurgery, Inc.

2007

Academia:

- Chris Ireland, University of Utah
- Thomas Wilkerson, Utah State University
- Bonnie Baxter, Westminster College

Education:

- Paul Nance, Jordan School District

Government:

- Greg Jones, Moran Eye Center

Industry:

- Jerry R. Nelson, Nelson Laboratories, Inc.
- Josh James, Omniture

Special:

- Jack Sunderlage, ContentWatch

2008

Academia:

- Brent Adams, Brigham Young University
- David S. Chapman, University of Utah

Education:

- Lee Siegel, University of Utah
- Bonnie Bourgeous, Clearfield High School
- Vickie Ahlstrom, Sego Lily Elementary

Industry:

- H. Dewayne Ashmead, Albion Laboratories, Inc.

Government:

- David Wakefield, Utah Department of Public Safety/Forensic Services

Special:

- Mario Capecchi, University of Utah

2009

Academia:

- Randall J. Olsen, Moran Eye Center

Education:

- W. Farrell Edwards, Utah State University
- Glen Westbroek, Alpine School District
- National Library of Virtual Manipulatives, Utah State University

Industry:

- Ashok C. Khandkar, Amedica Corp
- Reaveley Engineers & Associates

Government:

- William R. Lund, Utah Geological Survey

=== 2010s ===
2010

Academia:

- Paul Israelsen, Utah State University
- Peter B. Armentrout, University of Utah

Education:

- Louisa Stark, Genetic Science Learning Center
- Doug Panee, Oak Canyon Jr. High

Industry:

- Dennis Farrar, Upstart Ventures
- D. Clark Turner, Aribex, Inc

Government:

- Kevin Jensen, Forage & Range Research Lab

2011

Academia:

- Byard D. Wood, Utah State University
- Bruce Bugbee, Utah State University
- Edward M. Eyring, University of Utah

Education:

- Hugo Rossi, University of Utah

Industry:

- Tim Miller, Echelon Biosciences
- Kelly B. Powers, CR Bard Access Systems

Government:

- Amanda Smith, Department of Environmental Quality

Special:

- Richard R. Nelson, Utah Technology Council
- Gary Harter, Governor's Office of Economic Development
- Jeff Edwards, EDCUtah
- Steve Rodgers, EmergenTek

2012

Academia:

- David Kieda, University of Utah
- Geraldine Mineau University of Utah
- Thure E. Cerling, University of Utah

Education:

- Adam Johnston, Weber State University
- Amy Pace, Open High School of Utah

Industry:

- Dale Taylor, Ceramics Material Technologies
- Theodore Stanley, Anesta and ZARS

Government:

- Ted McAleer, USTAR
- Nicole Toomey Davis, Enclavix, LLC
- Scott Anderson, Zions Bank

2013

Academia:

- Henry S. White, University of Utah ACA
- Kenneth L. White, Utah State University ACA

Education:

- Aloysius S. Church, University of Utah

Industry:

- IM Flash Technologies
- Larry Grandia, Health Catalyst
- Larry Rigby, Larada Sciences

Government:

- Tamara Goetz, Utah Valley University

2014

Academia:

- Phyllis Coley, University of Utah
- Erik Jorgensen, University of Utah

Education:

- Christine Celestino, Juan Diego Catholic High School
- Helen Hu, Westminster College

Industry:

- Niel Holt, Space Dynamics Laboratory
- Ronald Weiss, ARUP Laboratories
- US Synthetic

Special:

- Troy D’Ambrosio, University of Utah

2015

Academia:

- Noelle E. Cockett, Utah State University
- Joel Harris, University of Utah

Education:

- Michelle Baker, Utah State University
- Christine Hailey, Utah State University
- Richard B. Brown, University of Utah
- Paul Hill, Utah State University

Industry:

- Susan Opp, L-3 Communications
- Rich Linder, CoNextions Medical
- Nelson Laboratories

Special:

- Sarah George, University of Utah
- Tom Parks, University of Utah

2016

Academia:

- Cynthia Burrows, University of Utah
- Cynthia Furse, University of Utah
- Timothy McLain, Brigham Young University
- Terry Messmer, Utah State University
- John Morrey, Utah State University
- Kyle Rollins, Brigham Young University

Education:

- Debra Spielmaker, Utah State University
- Adam Beehler, University of Utah

Industry:

- ENVE Composites
- Lawrence Thatcher, The Thatcher Company

Government:

- Robert Baskin, US Geological Survey

Special:

- Vivian S. Lee, University of Utah

2018

Academia:

- Dana Carroll, University of Utah

Education:

- Tyson Grover, Davis School District

Industry:

- George Hansen, Conductive Composites

Lifetime Achievement:

- Russell M. Nelson

2019

Academia:

- Randall J Olson, University of Utah

Education:

- Diane Crim, Bryant Middle School

Industry:

- Precision Genomics, Intermountain Healthcare

Lifetime Achievement:

- Fred Lampropoulos

=== 2020s ===
2020

Lifetime Achievement:

- Dinesh C. Patel

2022

Academia:

- Bruce Gale, University of Utah

Education:

- Kelli Booth, Northern Academy for Math, Engineering, and Science

Industry:

- Christopher Gibson, Recursion

2023

Academia:

- Julie Valentine, Brigham Young University

Education:

- Lora Gibbons, Mountain Heights Academy

Industry:

- David Bearss, Halia Therapeutics

2024

Academia:

- Cornelia Ulrich, Huntsman Cancer Institute

Education:

- Juliette Bautista Barahona, Club Ability

Industry:

- Gregory C. Critchfield, Early Diagnostics

2025

Academia:

- Denise Dearing, University of Utah

Education:

- Nicola Hack, Salt Lake Center for Science Education

Industry:

- Sidney J. Green, TerraTek

2026

Academia:

- D. Kip Solomon, University of Utah

Education:

- Teresa Hislop, Ogden Preparatory Academy

Industry:

- Jennifer Hwu, InnoSys, Inc.

Government:

- Jed Hancock, USU Space Dynamics Laboratory
