= Riverton High School (Utah) =

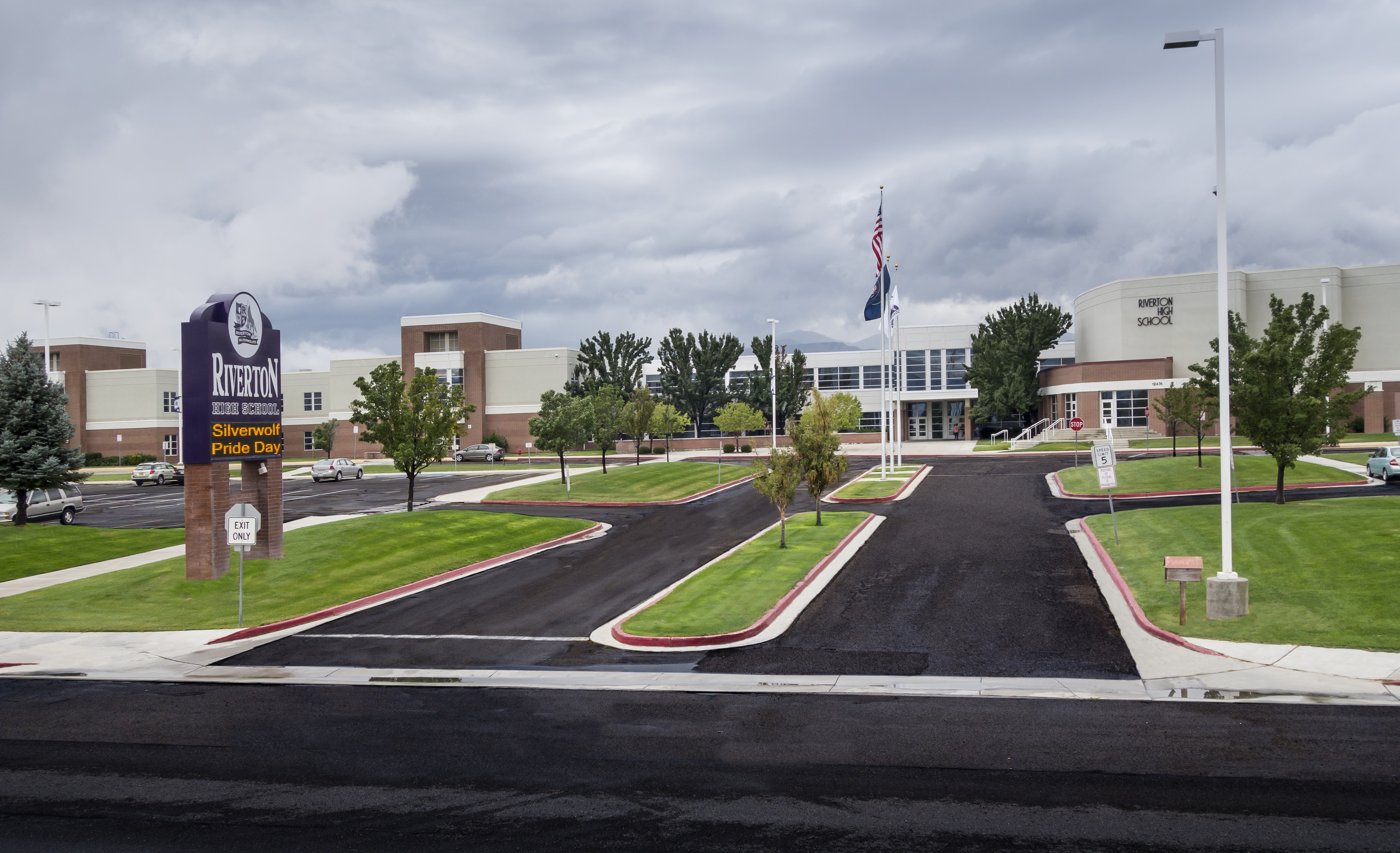
- Home of the Silverwolves

Location
- 12476 S. Silverwolf Way; Riverton, Utah 84065; United States; 40°31′30″N 111°57′35″W

Information
- Type: Public high school
- Motto: "Be strong enough to stand alone; Be wise enough to stand together."
- Established: February 28, 1999
- School district: Jordan School District
- Principal: Rochelle Waite
- Teaching staff: 90.56 (FTE)
- Grades: 10th-12th
- Enrollment: 2,326 (2023-2024)
- Student to teacher ratio: 25.68
- Colors: Purple; Silver; Black
- Slogan: Learning Driven
- Fight song: Hail To Our Riverton Pack
- Mascot: Sylvester Silverwolf
- Team name: Silverwolves
- Publication: Tabula Rasa (literary magazine)
- Newspaper: The Silver Scribe
- Yearbook: Pause
- News production: Silver Screen
- Charity drive: Silver Rush
- Crest
- Website: Official website

Riverton High School (abbreviated “Riverton” or “RHS”) is a public high school situated on a 52-acre (210,000 m²) campus in Riverton, Utah, in the southwest corner of the Salt Lake Valley. It is one of eight high schools in the Jordan School District and, as of 2024, serves approximately 2,326 students from parts of Riverton and parts of nearby Bluffdale.

== History ==
Riverton High School was proposed in the late 1990s as a measure to relieve overcrowding in the rapidly growing southwest area of the Jordan School District. Once completed, it was intended to enroll students from the cities of Riverton, Herriman, and Bluffdale: an area that at the time was primarily served by the overcrowded Bingham High School.

In 1997, the building contract for the school was awarded to Union Pointe Construction Corp., and construction began. The school was built according to the Jordan School District’s policy of basing high school designs on a single, evolving model, and is therefore architecturally similar to other area high schools such as Jordan, Copper Hills, Timpanogos, Lone Peak, and Herriman. The first year of school, 1999-2000, began while some components were still being completed.

The local student population continued to increase rapidly, and by 2009 Riverton High School was the largest high school in Utah. In 2010, students from Herriman and parts of western Riverton began to attend the newly constructed Herriman High School, which is considered Riverton’s unofficial rival.

== Silver Rush ==
Silver Rush began during Riverton High’s first operating school year, 1999-2000, as a winter charity drive similar to those at other schools in the area; fundraising efforts took place entirely within the school, and a reward assembly for students was held at the end of the drive.

During the next school year, the focus of the drive expanded to emphasize the selected charity and to include fundraising in local neighborhoods in addition to the school itself. Many of the fundraising activities begun during the 2000-2001 school year became traditions that continue as part of the drive, including door-to-door “odd jobs” in exchange for donations and a date auction of the Student Body Officers. In 2016, the Student Body President was auctioned for a record $2,000.

One of the distinctive aspects of Silver Rush is that the Riverton Student Body Officers choose a different charity each year. They conduct a multi-month selection process that includes interviewing representatives from prospective charities. In recent years, beneficiaries have included the International Rescue Committee (IRC), ShelterKids, Now I Can, South Valley Services, Millie’s Princess Foundation, Mitchell’s Journey, Intermountain Healing Hearts, the Olive Osmond Hearing Fund, the Haley Bell Blessed Chair Foundation, and others. The student body and community emphasize that “it’s not about the money; it’s about the change.”

As Silver Rush expanded, additional fundraising events were held, including a yearly Battle of the Bands competition, (Note: Riverton High’s first Battle of the Bands was organized by the school’s PTSA on January 10, 2007 as an event separate from Silver Rush; the contest began donating proceeds to Silver Rush at least as early as the winter of the 2008-2009 school year.) Mr. Silver Rush (a male beauty pageant), community auctions, charitable donations from the proceeds of product fundraisers held by local businesses, and benefit concerts, including several featuring Jon Schmidt, one featuring Collin Raye, and one featuring Alex Boyé and David Osmond.

In December 2015, Silver Rush raised approximately $130,000 for Mitchell’s Journey.

In December 2016, Silver Rush raised approximately $191,000 for Millie’s Princess Foundation. Since 1999, Silver Rush raised a total of over a million dollars as of December 2016.

In December 2017, Silver Rush raised approximately $178,000 for the Now I Can Foundation.

In December 2018, Silver Rush raised approximately $210,000 for Shelter Kids.

In December 2019, Silver Rush raised approximately $176,076 for South Valley Services.

In December 2020, Silver Rush raised approximately $90,100 for Bear O’ Care during the COVID-19 pandemic.

In December 2021, Silver Rush raised approximately $194,000 for The Single Parent Project.

In December 2022, Silver Rush raised approximately $262,229 for the Children’s Justice Center, which at the time was the most money raised by Riverton High School’s Silver Rush.

In December 2023, Silver Rush raised approximately $207,667 for The Sharing Place.

In December 2024, Silver Rush raised approximately $173,487 for The Refuge Utah.

In December 2025, Silver Rush raised approximately $257,300 for We Give Hope Foundation, and Jordan School District’s Mental Health Access Program.

== School Athletics ==
Riverton High School has an athletics program that includes the following sports:

- Football
- Basketball
- Lacrosse
- Cross Country
- Golf
- Soccer
- Softball
- Swim
- Tennis
- Track
- Volleyball
- Wrestling
- Baseball
- Marching Band

== Test scores ==
=== American College Test (ACT) ===
The ACT includes testing in Math, Science, Reading, and English. Scale scores range from 1 (low) to 36 (high) for each of the four tests and for the composite score, which is the average of the four test scores, rounded to the nearest whole number.

Year	School Composite	District Composite	Utah Composite	National Composite
2013-2014	21.1	20.3	20.8	21.0
2012-2013	20.6	20.3	20.7	20.9
2011-2012	20.7	20.1	20.7	21.1
2010-2011	22.1	21.8	21.8	21.1
2009-2010	21.8	21.8	21.8	21.0
2008-2009	21.5	22.0	21.8	21.1
2007-2008	21.6	22.1	21.8	21.1

=== Advanced Placement Test (AP) ===
Advanced Placement (AP) classes are college-level courses offered at the high school. AP is a national program administered by the College Board. Many colleges and universities award credit based on AP Exam scores.

Year	School % Passing	District % Passing	State % Passing	Nation % Passing
2013-2014	72	71	68	61
2012-2013	72	68	68	61
2011-2012	73	68	69	61
2010-2011	72	68	69	60
2009-2010	66	67	67	58
2008-2009	57	67	65	59
2007-2008	56	67	65	58

== Notable alumni ==
- Jordan Teuscher, member of the Utah House of Representatives
- Morgan Grim (2007), basketball player who played professionally in Germany
- Darian Jenkins (2013), soccer player who played in the NWSL
- Joe Barlow (2014), baseball player who played for the Texas Rangers
- Brandon Sly (2014), basketball player who plays professionally in North Macedonia
