= Mountain Ridge High School =

Mountain Ridge High School may refer to:

- Mountain Ridge High School (Maryland), Frostburg, Maryland
- Mountain Ridge High School (Arizona), Glendale, Arizona
- Mountain Ridge High School (Utah), Herriman, Utah
