= Cade Uluave =

American football player (born 2005)

No. 4 – BYU Cougars
- Position: Linebacker
- Class: Senior

Personal information
- Born: May 2, 2005 (age 21)
- Listed height: 6 ft 1 in (1.85 m)
- Listed weight: 235 lb (107 kg)

Career information
- High school: Mountain Ridge (Herriman, Utah)
- College: California (2023–2025); BYU (2026–present)

Awards and highlights
- Pac-12 Defensive Freshman of the Year (2023); First-team All-ACC (2025)
- Stats at ESPN

Cade Uluave (born May 2, 2005) is an American college football linebacker for the BYU Cougars. He previously played for the California Golden Bears. He was named the Pac-12 Defensive Freshman of the Year in 2023.

== Early life ==
Uluave was born on May 2, 2005 , and grew up in South Jordan, Utah. His father was also a college football linebacker at Southern Utah University. He attended Mountain Ridge High School and played football, baseball and track and field. In football, he was a two-way player as a linebacker and running back, running for 1,638 yards and 26 touchdowns while totaling 154 tackles and five sacks in his high school career. Ranked a three-star recruit, the 11th-best player in the state and the 72nd-best linebacker nationally by 247Sports, Uluave committed to play college football for the California Golden Bears.

== College career ==
=== California ===
Uluave expected to see action on special teams as a true freshman at California in 2023, but after an injury to Jackson Sirmon he began to see extensive playing time on defense. He received Pac-12 Conference player of the week honors several times and finished the season with 13 games played, six as a starter. He was the leader in the conference among freshmen in tackles and tackles-for-loss (TFLs), totaling 66 tackles, 6.5 TFLs, 2.5 sacks, two interceptions, two forced fumbles and two fumble recoveries en route to being named the Pac-12 Defensive Freshman of the Year. He was selected third-team all-conference by Phil Steele and was named a freshman All-American.

On January 3, 2026, Uluave announced that he would enter the transfer portal.

=== BYU ===
On January 13, 2026, Uluave announced that he would transfer to BYU.

== Personal life ==
Uluave is of Tongan descent.
