= Bruce Bugbee =

American scientist

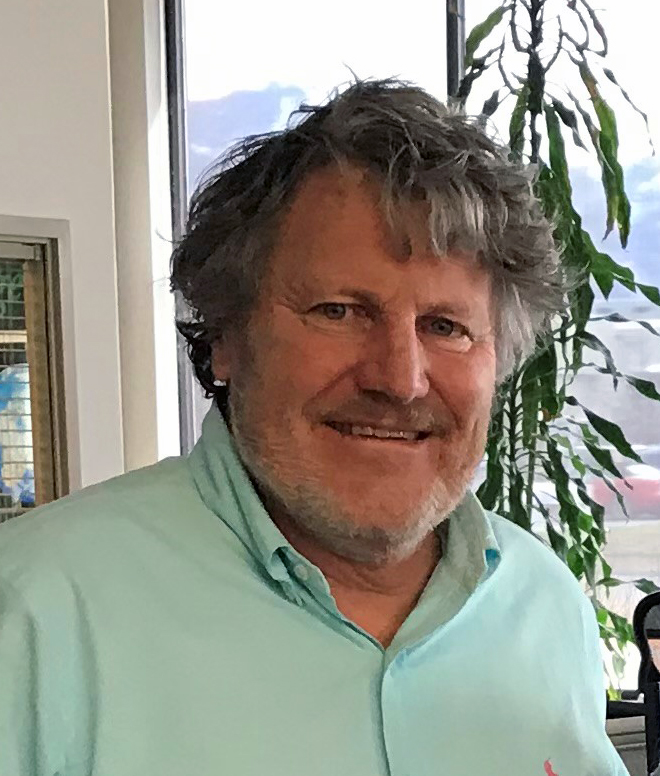
- Education: University of Minnesota (BS, 1974); University of California, Davis (MS, 1978); Penn State University (PhD, 1981)
- Known for: NASA life support systems research Controlled environment agriculture Founder of Apogee Instruments
- Awards: American Society of Agronomy Fellow (2018); Utah Governor's Medal for Science and Technology (2016); USU D. Wynne Thorne Career Research Award (2015)

Bruce Bugbee is an American scientist. His work includes research into space farming with NASA and at Utah State University, where he is the Director of the Crop Physiology Laboratory.

He is also the founder and president of Apogee Instruments, a manufacturer of environmental sensors used in agricultural, ecological, and climate research.

He is recognized for his work on plant responses to light, particularly the application of light-emitting diode (LED) technology to horticulture and controlled-environment crop production.

== Early life and education ==
Bugbee was born in Paynesville, Minnesota and earned a Bachelor of Science from the University of Minnesota before completing a Master of Science from the University of California, Davis.

He subsequently received a Doctor of Philosophy from Pennsylvania State University, where his graduate research focused on plant physiology and environmental influences on crop growth.

== Career ==
Following completion of his doctoral studies, Bugbee joined Utah State University as an assistant professor in the Department of Plant Science. As the department evolved, he later became an associate professor and subsequently professor in the Department of Plants, Soils and Climate.

At Utah State University, Bugbee established the Crop Physiology Laboratory, where he has supervised graduate students, postdoctoral researchers, and visiting scientists working in plant physiology, environmental physics, horticulture, and controlled-environment agriculture. His laboratory integrates plant biology with engineering and environmental measurement to investigate factors affecting crop productivity under both field and controlled conditions. He currently serves as Director of the Crop Physiology Laboratory at Utah State University, where he leads research on crop physiology, controlled-environment agriculture, environmental instrumentation, and plant production for space exploration.

His research has primarily been supported by the National Aeronautics and Space Administration (NASA). Funding has also come from the United States Department of Agriculture (USDA), the National Science Foundation (NSF), and private research sponsors.

In 1996, Bugbee founded Apogee Instruments, an environmental sensor manufacturer based in Logan, Utah. Established while he was a professor at Utah State University, the company initially developed scientific sensors for agricultural and environmental research. Under his leadership, Apogee Instruments expanded its product line to include instruments used in agriculture, horticulture, ecology, meteorology, renewable energy, and climate research.

He served as chair of the Crop Physiology Division of the American Society of Agronomy from 2003 to 2004 and was elected chair of the society's Biophysical Sensors and Measurements Community from 2014 to 2015.

== Research ==
Bugbee's research spans crop physiology, controlled-environment agriculture, environmental physics, and space biology. His work has focused on understanding how environmental variables—including light quality, radiation, temperature, carbon dioxide, water availability, and mineral nutrition—influence plant growth, photosynthesis, and crop yield.

=== Hydroponics and controlled-environment agriculture ===
Since the 1980s, Bugbee has conducted research on hydroponic crop production and controlled-environment agriculture. His work has examined nutrient management in recirculating hydroponic systems, mineral nutrition, water-use efficiency, and the environmental factors that regulate plant growth. He has investigated methods to optimize crop productivity while reducing resource consumption, contributing to the development of sustainable greenhouse and indoor production systems.

=== Space agriculture ===
Space agriculture has been a central focus of Bugbee's research throughout his career. Beginning shortly after joining Utah State University in 1981, he collaborated with the National Aeronautics and Space Administration (NASA) on biological life-support systems for long-duration human spaceflight. His research has investigated crop production in controlled environments, regenerative life-support systems, and plant growth under reduced-gravity conditions for future lunar and Martian missions.

In 2017, Bugbee became a co-investigator in the NASA-funded Center for the Utilization of Biological Engineering in Space (CUBES), a multi-institutional Space Technology Research Institute established to develop biological technologies for sustainable human exploration beyond Earth.

=== Plant breeding for space agriculture ===
In 1996, he released the super-dwarf wheat cultivar “Apogee” for food production in space. Apogee is the point in an orbit farthest from the Earth. Apogee wheat has been used in research on the International Space Station.

=== Plant lighting and photobiology ===
Bugbee is recognized for his research on the effects of light intensity, spectral composition, and photoperiod on photosynthesis, plant morphology, and crop productivity. His studies have helped establish principles for the application of light-emitting diode (LED) technology in greenhouse and indoor agriculture, including investigations into photon efficacy, spectral optimization, and energy efficiency. His work has contributed to the development of lighting strategies for controlled-environment crop production and vertical farming.

=== Indoor farming ===
Bugbee has studied the opportunities and limitations of indoor agriculture, particularly its energy requirements. While acknowledging its value for high-value crops and controlled production systems, he has argued that the electricity required for artificial lighting presents a formidable barrier to large-scale food production. His research has therefore emphasized improving the efficiency of LED lighting and environmental control systems to reduce energy consumption while maintaining crop productivity. From 2018 to 2023, he was a co-investigator in a multidisciplinary research project supported by a US$5 million grant from the U.S. Department of Agriculture's Specialty Crop Research Initiative to improve the energy efficiency of indoor farming systems.

=== Environmental instrumentation ===
In addition to plant physiology, Bugbee's research has focused on environmental measurement and instrumentation. He has published studies on the accurate measurement of photosynthetically active radiation, solar and net radiation, air temperature, and canopy light interception. These contributions have supported advances in agricultural meteorology, precision agriculture, and environmental monitoring and complement his work in the development of scientific sensors for agricultural and ecological research.

=== Phytoremediation ===
His work has included numerous studies on the plant uptake of toxic compounds from soils, a discipline called phytoremediation.

=== Sustainable materials ===
In the mid-2020s, Bugbee expanded his research to include the use of natural plant fibers as sustainable alternatives to petroleum-based materials. As part of Utah State University's Natural Fiber Hub, he has investigated the use of industrial hemp fibers as reinforcement in concrete, examining factors including fiber length, concentration, crop production, and the resulting mechanical properties of composite materials. The research forms part of a multidisciplinary initiative aimed at developing renewable natural fibers for applications in construction, textiles, and other industries while reducing reliance on synthetic plastics.

== Publications ==
Bugbee is the author or co-author of numerous scientific publications. His invited book chapters have addressed topics including LED lighting for plant production, hydroponic nutrient management, phytoremediation, environmental instrumentation, and crop production in space. He also co-edited Life Sciences and Space Research: Natural and Artificial Ecosystems (1992) and Advanced Technology for Human Life Support in Space, reflecting his long-standing involvement in space-related agricultural research.

His Google Scholar metrics include an “h-index” of over 61, with over 13,000 cumulative citations to his published manuscripts.

== Honors and recognition ==
- Elected a Fellow of the American Society for Horticultural Science (2020)
- Elected Fellow of the American Society of Agronomy (2018)
- Distinguished Alumni Award from Pennsylvania State University (2017)
- Utah State University's D. Wynne Thorne Career Research Award (2016)
- Distinguished Professor of the College of Agriculture (2015)
- Governor's Medal for Science from the State of Utah (2012)
- Outstanding Graduate Mentor (2001)
- Top Professor Award (2001).

== Personal life ==
Bugbee is married to his wife Diana West and lives in the Crockett House (Logan, Utah), a home registered in the National Register of Historic Places, where the two have designed and planted a 30 x 40 foot flower design every summer since 1987. The design changes each year and has included tributes to classic children’s books, famous people, and world events. They frequently host community events and fund raisers for non-profits. Co-authored with his wife, he has published a book that covers photography from each of the annual gardens since 1982.
