= Gene Loh =

Gene Loh may refer to:

- Eugene Loh, American physicist
- Loh I-cheng, Chinese diplomat
