= Jaren Kump =

American football player (born 2000)

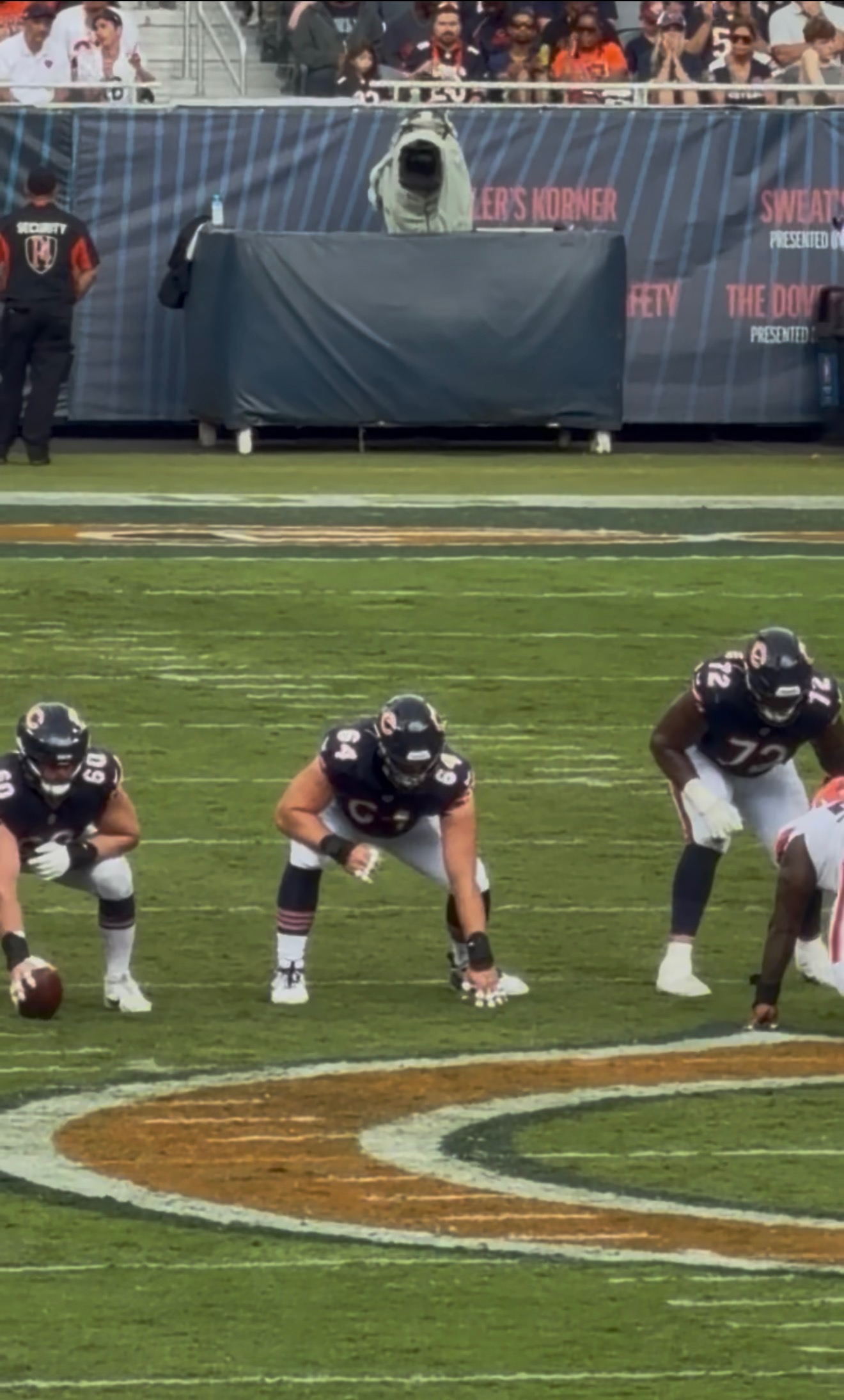

Profile
- Position: Offensive line

Personal information
- Born: January 10, 2000 (age 26); Riverton, Utah, U.S.
- Listed height: 6 ft 6 in (1.98 m)
- Listed weight: 315 lb (143 kg)

Career information
- High school: Herriman (Herriman, Utah)
- College: Utah (2020–2025)
- NFL draft: 2026: undrafted

Career history
- Chicago Bears (2026)*
- * Offseason or practice squad member only

Awards and highlights
- Rimington Trophy watch list (2025); William V. Campbell Trophy semifinalist (2025); All-Conference 2nd Team (College Football Network, 2024); All-Conference Honorable Mention (2025)
- Stats at Pro Football Reference

Jaren Kump (born January 10, 2000) is an American professional football offensive lineman. He played college football for the Utah Utes, where he started at all five offensive line positions and served as team captain in 2025. He signed with the Chicago Bears as an undrafted free agent after the 2026 NFL draft.

== Early life and high school ==
Kump was born and raised in Riverton, Utah and graduated from Herriman High School in 2018, where he was a 3-star recruit and the No. 9-ranked recruit in the state. As a senior he was named 1st-team all-state and helped Herriman win the 2015 Class 5A football state championship. He was also a 2-time all-region selection, earning 1st-team honors in 2017, and was named to the 2017 All-Salt Lake Tribune team and the 2017 1st-team All-USA Utah Football team. He averaged five pancake blocks a game as a senior, and also played defense, recording 33 tackles with 4.0 tackles for loss, 2.5 sacks, and two passes defended as a senior, after totaling 22 tackles (2.0 tackles for loss, 2.0 sacks) and one fumble recovery as a junior. He also competed in track and field, winning the Class 6A shot put state championship in 2017 (PR: 61' 9", 18.82 m) and the Class 6A discus state championship in 2018 (PR: 169' 9", 51.74 m). Additionally, he played basketball and rugby for Herriman High. Kump chose to play college football for Utah over BYU, Arizona State, Oregon, Cal, Arizona, UCLA, and USC. After high school, Kump served a 2-year mission for The Church of Jesus Christ of Latter-day Saints in João Pessoa, Paraíba, Brazil, from 2018 to 2020, before enrolling at the University of Utah.

== College career ==
Kump starting at all 5 offensive line positions.

Kump enrolled at the University of Utah and played for the Utah Utes from 2020 to 2025. Over his career he appeared in 59 games with 40 starts, starting at every position along the offensive line at least 1 time—left tackle, left guard, center, right guard, and right tackle. He started his collegiate career at right tackle as a freshman in the COVID-19-shortened 2020 season, went to left tackle until a season-ending injury in 2021, moved to guard in 2022, and settled in at center beginning in 2023, a position he held through the 2025 season. During Kump's time at Utah, the Utes won back-to-back Pac-12 championships in 2021 and 2022, reaching the Rose Bowl both years, and capped his final season with a Las Vegas Bowl victory over Nebraska in 2025.

Kump was selected by his teammates as a team captain for the 2025 season, which also included participation to the team's over arching leadership council. The 2025 season was also the last at Utah for longtime head coach Kyle Whittingham, who announced he would step down at the end of the season after 21 years leading the program. Whittingham called the 2025 offensive line unit the best offensive line "since I've been at the University of Utah.” In 2025, the unit Kump led helped the Utes to one of the top rushing attacks in the country and in program history in their 11 win and two loss season; Kump was named a semifinalist for the William V. Campbell Trophy, recognizing college football's top scholar-athlete, and was included on the Rimington Trophy watch list for the nation's top center. He earned honorable mention All-Big 12 honors in 2025 and had earlier been named to the College Football Network's 2024 All-Big 12 2nd team. He was also an Academic All-Big 12 selection.

Utah's offensive line, led by Kump and traditionally known as the "OBLOCK," was named to the Joe Moore Award midseason honor roll in 2025 before advancing to semifinalist status, one of 10 units recognized nationally for the award, which honors the sport's most outstanding offensive line unit. The 2025 OBLOCK, nicknamed "the Wasatch Front" in media coverage, was recognized as Big 12 Offensive Line of the Week 4 times during the season, following wins over UCLA, Arizona State, Colorado, and Baylor, and helped Utah set single-season program records of 3,462 rushing yards and 41 rushing touchdowns, surpassing the previous rushing record of 3,263 yards set in 1984. Utah's offense ranked 2nd in FBS in rushing yards per game (266.3) and 4th nationally in scoring (41.2 points per game) in 2025, while Pro Football Network rated the line's 1.58 yards before contact per designed run as 1st nationally (excluding service academies). The offensive line was also tied for 8th nationally in fewest sacks allowed, giving up just 11 across the season. According to Pro Football Focus, Kump allowed just nine pressures and zero sacks across 367 pass-blocking snaps in 2025.

Kump was named the University of Utah Athletics' recipient of the "3 C's of Excellence" award for the 2025-26 school year, given to a senior student-athlete for combined excellence in the classroom, athletic competition, and community engagement, as voted by fellow student-athletes. While playing his final season for the Utes, Kump completed a master's degree in Health & Kinesiology from Utah in 2026, with a thesis examining student-athletes' transition out of competitive sport. His offensive line coach, Jim Harding, called him one of the smartest players he had coached, saying Kump had "the highest football IQ of any player I've coached in the past 12 years."

Following his senior season, Kump accepted invitations to play in the inaugural The American Bowl in Lakeland, Florida, and in the 2026 East-West Shrine Bowl in Frisco, Texas, both college football all-star games showcasing NFL draft prospects.

== Professional career ==
Kump went undrafted in the 2026 NFL draft and signed with the Chicago Bears as an undrafted free agent shortly afterward. He was waived by Chicago as a part of final roster cuts on August 30, 2026.

== Academic research ==
As a graduate student, Kump completed a thesis examining the health and well-being challenges faced by NCAA Division I student-athletes transitioning out of competitive sport. The study surveyed 53 current and former Division I athletes and found that, across the board, athletes rated their own self-efficacy for managing post-career health as their weakest area, lower than the level of social support they felt they had. This suggests that although athletes felt they had adequate social support during their careers, they were less confident in their ability to manage their health behaviors after leaving competitive sport.

Kump was also a co-author on a study examining how the time of day resistance exercise is performed affects next-day blood sugar regulation, presented at the American College of Sports Medicine's annual meeting and published in Medicine & Science in Sports & Exercise. In a randomized crossover trial of adults with overweight or obesity, evening exercise improved blood sugar tolerance the following morning compared with morning exercise, though blood sugar responses a day later were higher after evening exercise.

== Personal life ==
Kump is married to Sydney Kump. He is fluent in the Portuguese language.
