= Crockett House (Logan, Utah) =

- U.S. National Register of Historic Places
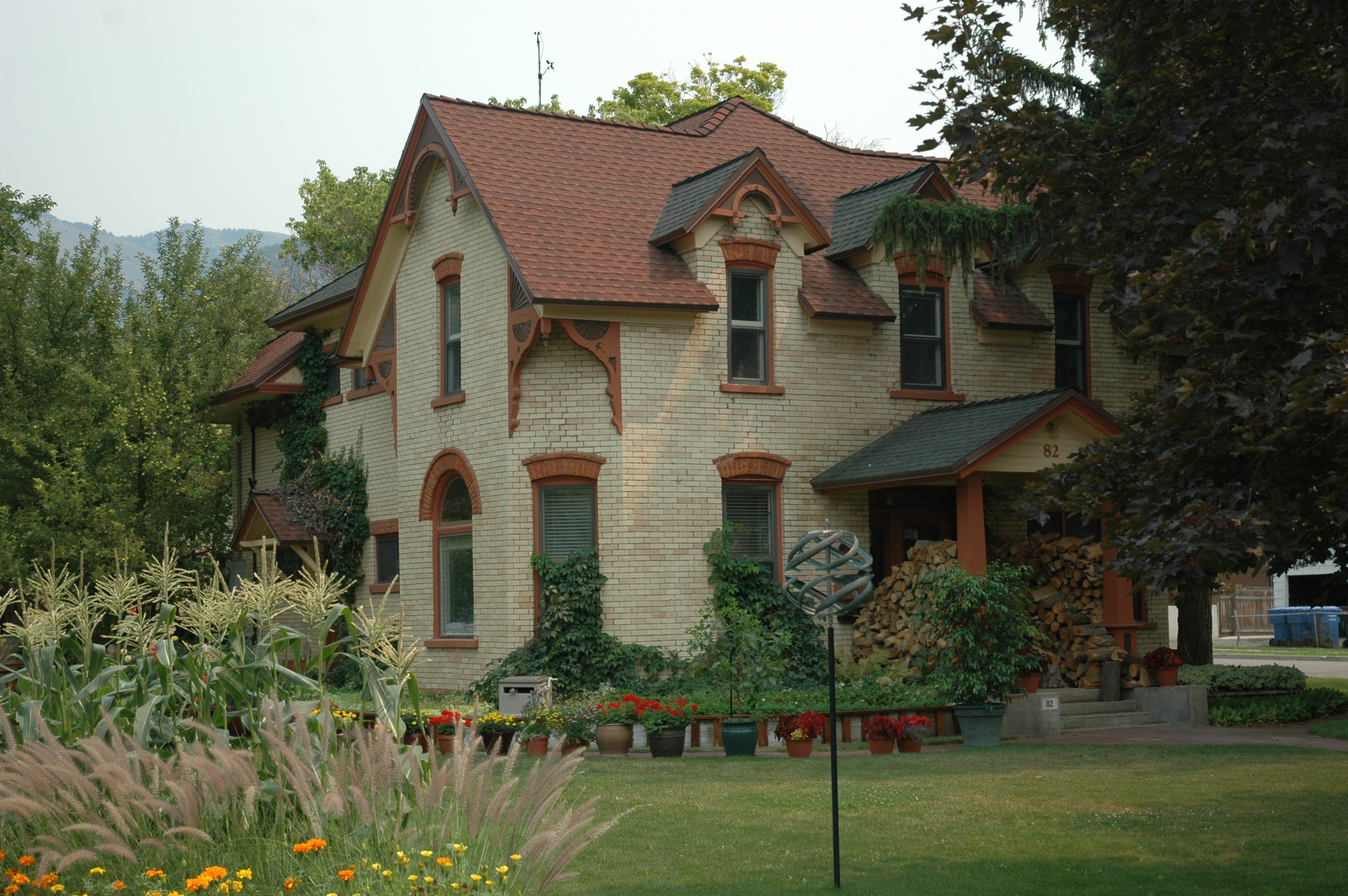

- Location within Utah Location within the United States
- Location: 82 Crockett Ave., Logan, Utah
- Coordinates: 41°44′04″N 111°48′44″W
- Area: 0.7 acres (0.28 ha)
- Built: 1887
- Built by: Crockett, Alvin D.
- Architectural style: Gothic Revival, Victorian Eclectic
- NRHP reference No.: 09000017
- Added to NRHP: April 27, 2009

The Crockett House, at 82 Crockett Ave. in Logan, Utah, was built in 1887. It was listed on the National Register of Historic Places in 2009.

It is a 4,000 square feet (370 m^{2}) Gothic Revival-style house with hand-carved gables and a large front porch. It was built by craftsmen for Alvin D. Crockett.

Alvin Crockett (1831-1902) served for two terms as mayor of Logan, and served as Cache County sheriff for 15 years. He had 18 children with two wives.

The house was bought by Utah State University professor Bruce Bugbee in 1981, who renovated the house and applied for, and received, National Register recognition.

It has also been known as the Alvin & Annie Crockett House and as the John & Anna Crockett House. A second contributing building is on the property.
