= Francis Bernard (American football) =

American football player (born 1995)

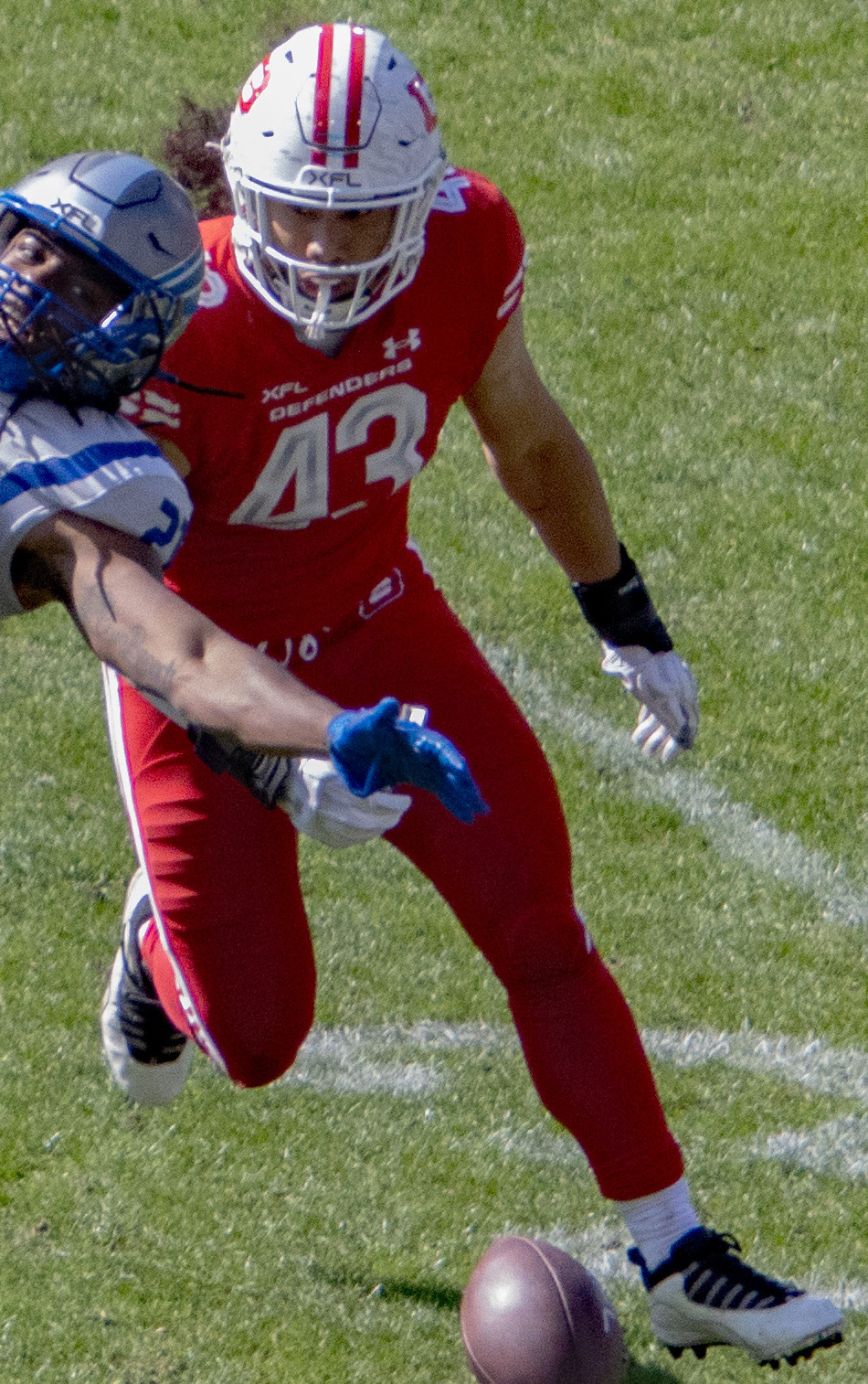
- Bernard with the DC Defenders in 2023

No. 44, 53, 43
- Position: Linebacker

Personal information
- Born: April 8, 1995 (age 31); South Jordan, Utah, U.S.
- Listed height: 6 ft 1 in (1.85 m)
- Listed weight: 230 lb (104 kg)

Career information
- High school: Herriman (Herriman, Utah)
- College: BYU (2015-2016); Utah (2018-2019)
- NFL draft: 2020: undrafted

Career history
- Dallas Cowboys (2020–2021); DC Defenders (2023–2024)

Awards and highlights
- First-team All-Pac-12 (2019)

Career NFL statistics
- Total tackles: 10
- Stats at Pro Football Reference

Francis Bernard (born April 8, 1995) is an American former professional football player who was a linebacker for the Dallas Cowboys of the National Football League (NFL). He played college football for the BYU Cougars and Utah Utes.

== Early life ==
After playing his freshman year of high school football at Bingham High School, he transferred to Herriman High School. As a sophomore, he had 139 carries for 754 yards and 8 touchdowns.

As a junior, he was a two-way player at running back and linebacker, totaling 178 carries for 1,547 yards, 22 touchdowns and 29 tackles and one interception. He received Region Offensive MVP honors, Region 7 and Class 4A All-state honors at running back.

As a senior, he tallied 96 carries for 822 yards, 15 touchdowns, 24 tackles and 4 interceptions. He received Region 7 and Class 4A honorable-mention All-state honors at running back. He committed to Brigham Young University on December 11, 2012. He also practiced basketball and rugby.

Bernard served in a mission for the Church of Jesus Christ of Latter-day Saints in Atlanta for 2 years.

== College career ==
As a true freshman at BYU in 2015, he was a backup running back and appeared in 10 games. He registered 52 carries for 334 yards (second on the team), a 6.4-yard average, 7 rushing touchdowns (second on the team), 17 receptions for 56 yards and 2 receiving touchdowns.

As a sophomore in 2016, he was converted into a linebacker. He started 12 games at outside linebacker, posting 79 tackles (third on the team), 5.5 tackles for loss, 2 sacks, 3 interceptions (one returned for a touchdown) and 3 pass breakups. He had 16 tackles against Mississippi State University. He was not allowed to play in the 2016 Poinsettia Bowl due to a violation of team rules.

It was later revealed that he was also facing suspension for violating BYU's honor code. Bernard eventually elected to enroll at Rio Salado College, before transferring in August 2018 to the University of Utah. As a junior, he was part of a linebacking corp that included future NFL players Chase Hansen and Cody Barton. He started 2 out of 12 games in place of an injured Hansen. He collected 38 tackles (5 for loss), one interception and two pass breakups. He had 10 tackles against the University of Colorado.

As a senior in 2019, he started 14 games at middle linebacker and was a part of a stout defense that saw 6 players selected in the 2020 NFL draft. He recorded 85 tackles (second on the team), 7.5 tackles for loss (tied for fifth on the team) and 2 interceptions. He was named first-team All-Pac-12 and participated in the 2020 Senior Bowl. He had 12 tackles against Northern Illinois University.

== Professional career ==
Pre-draft measurables
Height	Weight	Arm length	Hand span	40-yard dash	Vertical jump	Broad jump	Bench press
6 ft 0 3/8 in (1.84 m)	234 lb (106 kg)	31 7/8 in (0.81 m)	9 7/8 in (0.25 m)	4.81 s	32.5 in (0.83 m)	10 ft 0 in (3.05 m)	19 reps
All values from NFL Combine

=== Dallas Cowboys ===
Bernard was signed as an undrafted free agent by the Dallas Cowboys after the 2020 NFL draft on April 27. He was waived on September 5, 2020, and signed to the practice squad the next day. He was elevated to the active roster on October 3 for the team's week 4 game against the Cleveland Browns, and reverted to the practice squad after the game. He was promoted to the active roster on October 10. He was a backup linebacker, appearing in 13 games, while registering one defensive tackle and 4 special teams tackles.

In 2021, he injured his hamstring on the first practice of training camp and reaggravated it during the last week of the preseason. On September 2, Bernard was placed on injured reserve to start the season. He was activated on November 6. He appeared in 8 games as a backup linebacker, making one defensive tackle and 3 special teams tackles. He wasn't re-signed after the season.

=== DC Defenders ===
On January 1, 2023, Bernard was selected by the DC Defenders in the sixth round of the 2023 XFL Supplemental Draft. He was placed on the reserve list by the team on March 7, and activated on March 20, 2023. He appeared in eight games with eight starts at inside linebacker, registering 51 tackles (leading the team), 0.5 sacks and six tackles for loss. He contributed to the team having a 10–1 record and playing in the XFL Championship Game against the Arlington Renegades. He was placed on the team's suspended list on May 22, 2024.

== Personal life ==
In October 2017, Bernard was cited in alcohol-and traffic-related offenses. Bernard is married with one son, and is an active member of the Church of Jesus Christ of Latter-day Saints, having served a mission in Atlanta.
