= Cynthia Furse =

American electrical engineer

Cynthia M. Furse (née Mahoney, born 1963) is an American electrical engineer, the director of graduate studies and a distinguished professor in the University of Utah Department of Electrical & Computer Engineering. Her research involves the use of finite-difference time-domain methods in computational simulations of the absorption and reflection of radio waves by other materials, with applications including the use of spread-spectrum time-domain reflectometry to diagnose aircraft wiring systems, the design of antennae in medical implants, and the effects of cell phone emissions on the human body. Her publications also include works on engineering education.

== Education and career ==
Furse was born in 1963 in Hartford, Maine. After her father, food scientist Arthur W. Mahoney, took a professorship at Utah State University in 1969, she grew up in Logan, Utah. After beginning her studies in mechanical engineering, she became a student of electrical engineering at the University of Utah, where she earned a bachelor's degree in 1985, a master's degree in 1988, and a Ph.D. in 1994. Her master's work was mentored by Magdy Iskander; Om P. Gandhi became her doctoral supervisor.

Before returning to the University of Utah as a faculty member, she was a professor at Utah State University for five years, beginning in 1997. After moving to the University of Utah in 2002, she co-founded in 2003 and became chief scientist of Livewire Test Labs, a spinoff of the University of Utah that later became LiveWire Innovation. From 2009 to 2019, she served as Associate Vice President for Research at the University of Utah.

== Books ==
Furse is the author or coauthor of technical books including:

- Basic Introduction to Bioelectromagnetics (with Douglas A. Christensen and Carl H. Durney; 2nd ed., 2009, and 3rd ed., 2018)
- Circuit Analysis and Design (with Fawwaz Tayssir Ulaby and Michel M. Maharbiz, 2018)

She is also a coauthor of a local history book:

- History Of Emigration Canyon: Gateway to Salt Lake Valley (with Jeffrey Carlstrom, 2003; 2nd ed., 2019)

== Recognition ==
Furse was named an IEEE Fellow in 2008, "for leadership in electromagnetics education". She was named a Fellow the National Academy of Inventors in 2014. She was named a Fellow of the Applied Computational Electromagnetics Society in 2023, "for exceptional achievements and outstanding contributions in applied computational electromagnetics".

She was named Professor of the Year in the Utah State University College of Engineering in 2000. At the University of Utah, she was named the 2008 College of Engineering Distinguished Professor. She was a 2016 recipient of the Utah Governor's Medal for Science and Technology.

She was the 2009 recipient of the Hewlett-Packard Harriett B. Rigas Award of the IEEE Education Society, and the 2020 recipient of the Chen-To Tai Distinguished Educator Award of the IEEE Antennas and Propagation Society, given to her "for motivating, challenging, educating, and inspiring the next generation of EM engineers through innovative teaching, hands-on experiences, current research, and lively participation".
