= United First Financial =

United First Financial, LLC
- Company type: Private
- Industry: Financial services
- Headquarters: Bluffdale, Utah, USA
- Website: www.Unitedfirstfinancial.com

United First Financial, headquartered in Draper, Utah, is a financial software services and support company that focuses primarily on mortgage and debt reduction.

== History ==
Skyler Witman and John Washenko founded United First Financial in January 2010. Witman and Washenko launched their first company together in 1997, Accelerated Equity & Development, located in Bluffdale, Utah.

Its mortgage reduction program won the Ernst & Young Entrepreneur of the Year regional awards in 2008.

In 2009 the company had 60,000 distributors and 20,000 paying customers.

== Services ==
United First Financial uses a debt reduction technique very similar to the Australian mortgage. United First Financial uses a program called The Money Merge Account program, which uses existing banking tools, one-on-one coaching and a Web-based software tool to help consumers pay off their mortgages and consumer debt in a short amount of time.

This program has received criticism from financial experts as being unnecessary due to the cost of the initial investment and utter simplicity with which someone can apply the same budgeting principles for free.

== See also ==
- Australian mortgage
- Offset Mortgage
