= Bluffdale, Utah =

City in Utah, United States

- City
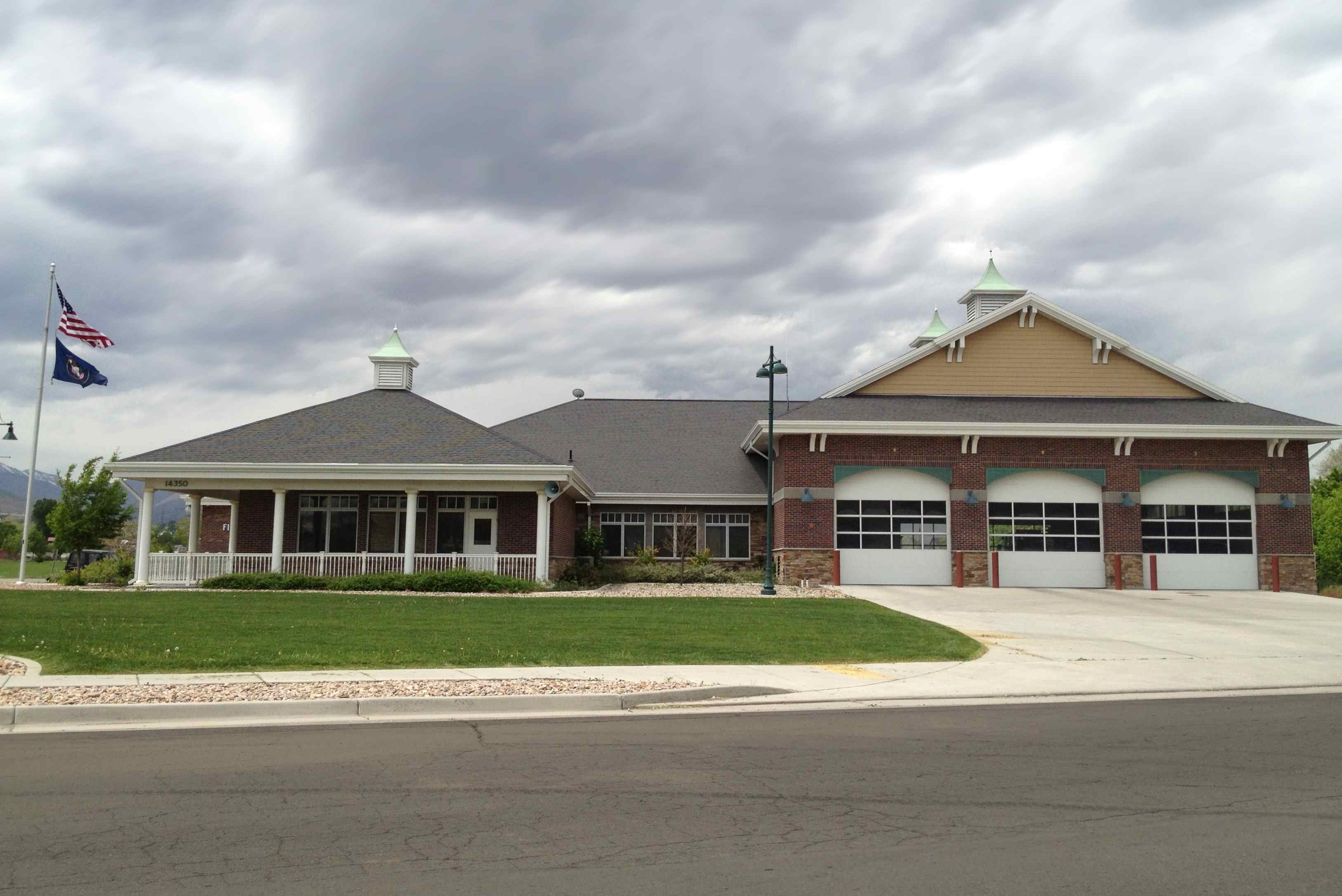
- Bluffdale Fire Station in 2013

- Location in Salt Lake County and the state of Utah.

- Location of Utah in the United States
- Coordinates: 40°28′24″N 111°56′40″W
- Country: United States
- State: Utah
- County: Salt Lake, Utah
- Founded: 1886
- Incorporated: October 13, 1978
- Named for: Bluffs and dales along the Jordan River

Area
  - Total: 11.14 sq mi (28.86 km^{2})
  - Land: 11.14 sq mi (28.85 km^{2})
  - Water: 0.0039 sq mi (0.01 km^{2})
- Elevation: 4,436 ft (1,352 m)

Population (2020)
  - Total: 17,014
  - Density: 1,527.4/sq mi (589.74/km^{2})
- Time zone: UTC-7 (MST)
  - Summer (DST): UTC-6 (MDT)
- ZIP code: 84065
- Area codes: 385, 801
- FIPS code: 49-06810
- GNIS feature ID: 2409871
- Website: bluffdale.gov

Bluffdale is a city in Salt Lake and Utah counties in the U.S. state of Utah, located about 20 miles (32 km) south of Salt Lake City. As of the 2020 census, the city population was 17,014.

== History ==
Bluffdale, named for its geography of bluffs and dales, was first settled in 1848–1849, when the area was originally part of West Jordan. On July 29, 1858, Orrin Porter Rockwell paid five- hundred dollars to Evan M. Green for sixteen acres of land near the Crystal Hot Lakes (adjacent to the present Utah State Prison). This land included Hot Springs Hotel and Brewery with dining facilities, a stable brewery, and a pony express station. As the community expanded, the Bluffdale area became part of South Jordan, then Riverton. In 1883 the Bluffdale School Precinct was formed from parts of Herriman, South Jordan, and Draper. On August 1, 1886, the Bluffdale Ward of The Church of Jesus Christ of Latter-day Saints was organized with Lewis H. Mousley as Bishop. For a short time, the town was called Mousley. Seven irrigation canals originate at the Jordan Narrows in the Bluffdale area and serve the Salt Lake Valley. One of the earliest was Utah, and Salt Lake Canal started in 1862. Some of the early buildings included an adobe church, built in 1887–1888, a tithing house, and a three-room schoolhouse constructed in 1893. The city was incorporated in 1978.

== Geography ==
Bluffdale has an area of 10.22 square miles (26.47 km^{2}) and an average elevation of 4,436 feet (1,352 m) above sea level. Bluffdale is predominately located in Salt Lake County, though a portion of the city is in Utah County. Bluffdale shares city borders with Herriman to the west, Riverton to the north, Draper to the east, and Lehi to the south.

Bluffdale is surrounded by wide open spaces with dramatic views of the Wasatch and Oquirrh Mountain Ranges. The Salt Lake Valley floor is the ancient lakebed of Lake Bonneville, which existed at the end of the last Ice Age. Several Lake Bonneville shorelines can be distinctly seen on the foothills or benches of nearby mountains. The Jordan River flows through the city and is a drainage of Utah Lake that empties into the Great Salt Lake.

== Climate ==
The climate of Bluffdale is semi-arid. Under the Köppen climate classification, Bluffdale has a hot-summer humid continental climate (Dfa) with hot summers and cold, snowy winters.

Bluffdale, Utah

Climate chart (precipitation, max. and min. temperature)
| J | F | M | A | M | J | J | A | S | O | N | D |
| 1.5 41 25 | 1.2 47 28 | 1.6 57 35 | 1.8 65 41 | 1.8 76 49 | 0.9 88 57 | 1 96 65 | 1 93 64 | 1.1 83 54 | 1.7 68 42 | 1.3 53 33 | 1 42 25 |
- █ Average max. and min. temperatures in °F
- █ Precipitation totals in inches
Metric conversion
| J | F | M | A | M | J | J | A | S | O | N | D |
| 38 5 −4 | 31 8 −2 | 40 14 2 | 46 18 5 | 45 24 9 | 22 31 14 | 24 36 18 | 24 34 18 | 27 28 12 | 44 20 6 | 34 12 1 | 24 6 −4 |
- █ Average max. and min. temperatures in °C
- █ Precipitation totals in mm

== Parks ==
The largest park in Bluffdale is Wardle Fields Regional Park, part of the Salt Lake County Parks system. At 40 acres, the park caters to the recreational needs of the region by providing a splash pad, a 25-foot tall watchtower, pickleball and basketball courts, bouldering walls, zip lines, and other amenities.

=== City Parks ===
Bluffdale has a system of 13 parks. Some of the most notable are:

- Bluffdale City Main Park (22.37 acres) is the city's largest park and features two pavilions, 16 picnic tables, a trail, sports fields and restrooms.
- Vintage Park (6.37 acres) is one of the city's newest parks and features pavilions and picnic tables, open grass areas, two pickleball and two tennis courts, a sand volleyball court and a splash pad.
- Independence Park (5.73 acres) features a splash pad, three pavilions, restrooms, and a variety of play equipment.
- Parry Farms Park features a pavilion, restrooms, four pickleball courts, a basketball court, a sledding hill, and play equipment. The parking lot on Jordan Parkway Trail. (5.63 acres)
- Parry Farms Baseball Fields has two little league size fields (7.22 acres)
- Phillip Gates Memorial Park a pavilion, restrooms, play equipment and walking trail(4.54 acres)
- Mount Jordan Park features open grass area, two pavilions, playground equipment and restrooms(3.69 acres)

=== Trails ===
The City hosts a variety of well-maintained trails. The Jordan River Parkway Trail is a 40-mile trail crossing three counties, and a significant section of the trail goes through Bluffdale. The City's trails include cycling, pedestrian, and equestrian routes.

== Demographics ==
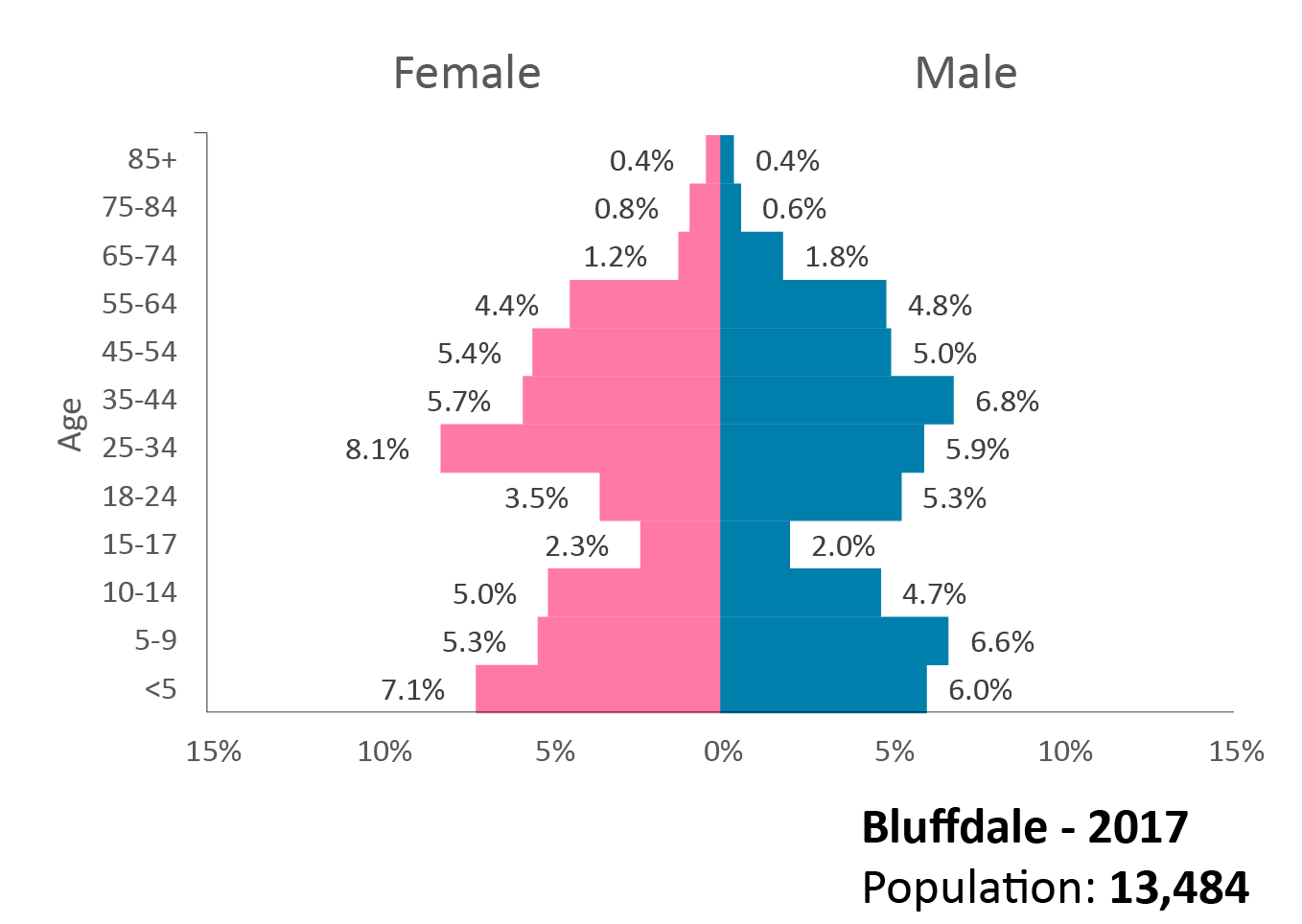
Bluffdale 2017 population pyramid

Historical population
| Census | Pop. | Note | %± |
|---|---|---|---|
| 1980 | 1,300 | | — |
| 1990 | 2,152 | | 65.5% |
| 2000 | 4,700 | | 118.4% |
| 2010 | 7,598 | | 61.7% |
| 2020 | 17,014 | | 123.9% |

Bluffdale is part of the Salt Lake City metropolitan area.

=== 2020 census ===
As of the 2020 census, Bluffdale had a population of 17,014. The median age was 27.8 years. 36.0% of residents were under the age of 18 and 5.6% of residents were 65 years of age or older. For every 100 females there were 99.9 males, and for every 100 females age 18 and over there were 98.0 males age 18 and over.

95.7% of residents lived in urban areas, while 4.3% lived in rural areas.

There were 4,755 households in Bluffdale, of which 55.9% had children under the age of 18 living in them. Of all households, 69.9% were married-couple households, 10.7% were households with a male householder and no spouse or partner present, and 14.7% were households with a female householder and no spouse or partner present. About 9.3% of all households were made up of individuals and 1.5% had someone living alone who was 65 years of age or older.

There were 4,947 housing units, of which 3.9% were vacant. The homeowner vacancy rate was 0.7% and the rental vacancy rate was 8.7%.

Racial composition as of the 2020 census
| Race | Number | Percent |
|---|---|---|
| White | 14,523 | 85.4% |
| Black or African American | 124 | 0.7% |
| American Indian and Alaska Native | 104 | 0.6% |
| Asian | 421 | 2.5% |
| Native Hawaiian and Other Pacific Islander | 98 | 0.6% |
| Some other race | 462 | 2.7% |
| Two or more races | 1,282 | 7.5% |
| Hispanic or Latino (of any race) | 1,433 | 8.4% |

=== 2010 census ===
As of the 2010 census, there were 7,598 people, 1,966 households, and 1,719 families residing in the city. The population density was 743.5 people per square mile. There were 2,059 housing units at an average density of 201.5 per square mile. The racial makeup of the city was 95.8% White, 0.4% African American, 0.3% Native American, 0.4% Asian, 0.3% Pacific Islander, 1.1% from other races, and 1.8% from two or more races. Hispanic or Latino of any race were 4.4% of the population.

There were 1,966 households, out of which 57.8% had children under 18 living with them, 74.7% were married couples living together, 8.7% had a female householder with no husband present, and 12.6% were non-families. Of all households, 9.8% were made up of individuals, and 14.0% had someone living alone who was 65 years of age or older. The average household size was 3.86, and the average family size was 4.15.

In the city, the population was spread out, with 38.2% under 18, 9.7% from 18 to 24, 25.1% from 25 to 44, 21.6% from 45 to 64, and 5.3% who were 65 years of age or older. The median age was 26 years. For every 100 females, there were 100.2 males.

The average household income in the city was US$67,392, and the average family income was US$78,180.

== Government ==
Bluffdale is part of Utah's 4th congressional district represented by Republican Burgess Owens (2020).

=== City Administration ===
Natalie Hall was elected Mayor in 2021. She was re-elected in 2025.

== Economy ==
Camp Williams is located south of Bluffdale. It contains the Utah Data Center for the United States Intelligence Community.

== Education ==
=== Schools ===
Bluffdale is in the Jordan School District. Within the city, there are five traditional public and four charter public schools. Bluffdale Elementary offers a Portuguese Dual Immersion program, while South Hills Middle School has been designated as a "School to Watch" by the National Forum to Accelerate Middle-Grades Reform.

Traditional Public

- Bluffdale Elementary School
- Mountain Point Elementary School
- South Hills Middle School--(located in Riverton City)
- Hidden Valley Middle School
- Riverton High School--(located in Riverton City)

Charter Public

- North Star Academy (K–9)
- Summit Academy (Independence)
- Summit Academy (14400 South)
- Summit High School

== Transportation ==
=== Roads ===
Bluffdale lies at the convergence of one major and two minor freeways: I-15, which runs north-to-south to the east of the city; Bangerter Highway, which runs east-to-west between Bluffdale and Riverton; and Mountain View Corridor, which runs north-to-south to the west of the City. Porter Rockwell Boulevard is a five-phase road project that serves as an I-15 and Mountain View Corridor connection, the only east-to-west connection in the county.

=== Public transportation ===
UTA bus route 219 has multiple stops in Bluffdale,Ut

Frontrunner runs through Bluffdale but has no stop in Bluffdale

=== Air transportation ===
Salt Lake City International Airport is approximately 28 miles (45 km) north of Bluffdale.

== See also ==
- List of cities and towns in Utah
- Apostolic United Brethren – headquarters of this sect is in Bluffdale
- United First Financial
- Utah State Prison located nearby until recently
