= Herriman High School =

- Herriman High School

Location
- 11917 South 6000 West; Herriman, Utah; United States; 40°32′02″N 112°01′53″W

Information
- Type: Public
- Motto: "It's a great day to be a Mustang!"
- Established: August 2010
- School district: Jordan School District
- Principal: Thomas Gatten
- Teaching staff: 96.84 (FTE)
- Enrollment: 2,415 (2023-2024)
- Student to teacher ratio: 24.94
- Campus size: 50 acres
- Colors: Maroon, Navy Blue & White; Limited Use: Vegas Gold
- Mascot: Mustangs
- Newspaper: Herriman Telegraph
- Cost: $75 million USD
- Website: Official website

Herriman High School (HHS) is a public high school in Herriman, Utah, United States. It is a part of the Jordan School District and serves students from the cities of Herriman, South Jordan, and Riverton. The school is a two-level facility, situated on a 50-acre campus, with views of the Salt Lake Valley and mountain ranges to the east and west. The school derived its mascot from the wild mustang horses that used to roam the southwestern corner of the Salt Lake Valley until they were relocated shortly after the school opened.

== History ==
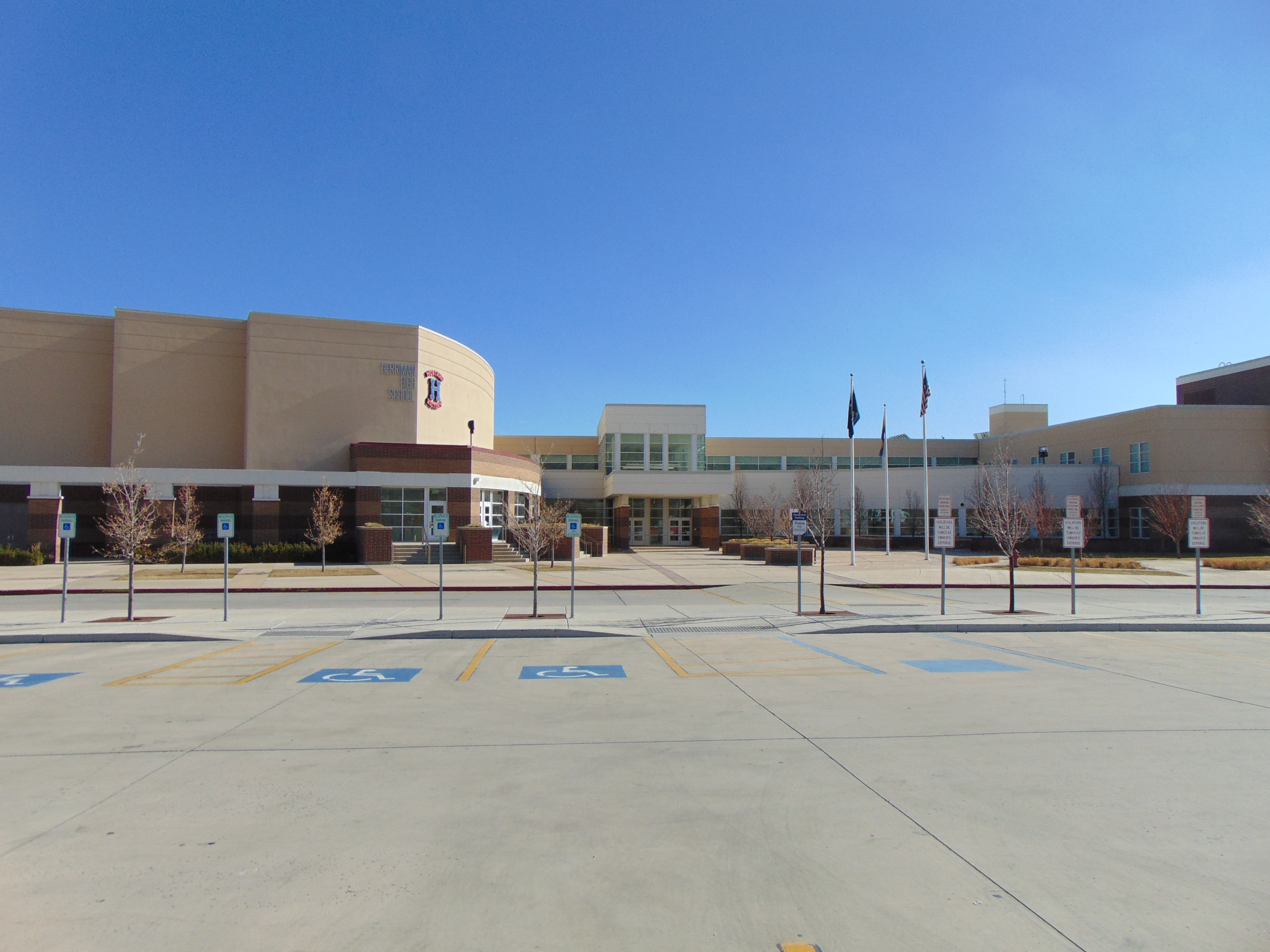
Herriman High School, November 2017

Herriman High School was opened in 2010 at the cost of $75 million and saw the construction of a main building with a capacity of 3,000 students, an auditorium, cafeteria, football stadium with synthetic turf, tennis courts, baseball and soccer fields, parking lots, and driving range. The school also houses a ceramic studio complete with three kiln ovens and a class set of throwing wheels, a fully equipped automative garage, and a wood workshop.

The high school draws students from nearby Copper Mountain Middle School and newer Mountain Creek Middle School. They previously drew students from Fort Herriman Middle School and Elk Ridge Middle School. Shortly after opening, student growth had caused Herriman High School to add multiple portable classrooms.

In 2017, out of concerns of overcrowding and transportation for the commuting students, another High School was built in Herriman: Mountain Ridge High School.

In January 2018, Herriman High School came under scrutiny for censoring the school's student newspaper, The Telegraph, after an investigation by its student journalists exposed how a teacher was fired for exchanging inappropriate text messages with a 17-year-old student. The school's choice to prevent the publishing of the article resulted in them being given the Jefferson Muzzle Award. The article was later republished on an underground student newspaper. The Jordan School District that Herriman High operates within was queried by multiple U.S. news media organizations about the censorship and free speech rights of students, including the Washington Post. After an investigation by the Utah State Board of Education, the teacher had their license revoked.

In April 2019, The Wall Street Journal published a report which described how the high school may have suffered a mental health crisis the previous year. At least seven students committed suicide during the school's 2017-2018 calendar year, prompting mental health initiatives from the Jordan School District, such as providing more of their campuses with a full-time psychologist.

== Athletics ==
Herriman High School has an athletics department that includes baseball, basketball, cross country, drill team, football, golf, hockey, marching band, rugby, soccer, softball, swim, tennis, track, volleyball, water-polo, and wrestling.

Herriman competes yearly in sports competition at the state level, and have won the Utah 4A boys cross country championship once in 2012 and the Utah 4A girls cross country championships twice in 2012 and 2013. They were 6A softball champions in 2018–2019. The Herriman boys track and field team took home the state title in 2014 and 2015, as did both the boys and girls teams in 2016. Herriman was the winner of the 5A boys state football championship in 2015. The boys rugby team is consistently ranked within the top-five high school rugby teams in America, and have taken home the national title multiple times–most recently in 2021. In 2022 the boys soccer team won State in Utah with a last minute shot giving them the champion title for high school soccer in Utah

== Notable alumni ==
- Francis Bernard, professional football player for the Dallas Cowboys
- Leki Fotu, professional football player for the Arizona Cardinals
- Blake Freeland, professional football player for the Indianapolis Colts
- Andre James, professional football player for the Las Vegas Raiders
- Jaren Kump, professional football player for the Chicago Bears
- Rory Linkletter, professional runner
- Kaysha Love, winter olympian, bobsled
