= USTAR =

The Utah Science Technology and Research Initiative (USTAR) is a technology-based economic development agency funded by the state of Utah. The organization works to develop ideas and research into marketable products and successful companies through its competitive grant and entrepreneur support programs. USTAR facilitates the diversification of the state’s tech economy, increases private follow-on investment, and supports the creation of technology-based start-up firms, higher-paying jobs and additional business activity leading to a statewide expansion of Utah’s tax base.

Since 2016, USTAR-supported companies have received $123 million in follow-on funding, created 424 full- and part-time jobs and generated $27 million in product sales, including a maximum addition of 351 percent in sales from the first to second year of USTAR’s new programs.

== History ==
=== 2006-2014: Senate Bill 75 ===
When it was initially established in 2006 when the Utah State Legislature passed Senate Bill 75, USTAR was originally focused on investments at the University of Utah (U of U) and Utah State University (USU) to recruit researchers, build interdisciplinary research and development facilities, and to form science, innovation and commercialization teams across the state.

==== Research Teams ====
The initiative included a principal research program designed to create world-class research teams in strategic innovation development areas. Through the principal researcher program, USTAR recruited more than 40 world-class faculty to higher education institutions located throughout Utah to invent and develop commercially viable technologies. Researchers from MIT, Harvard University, UCLA, Case Western, University of Arizona, Oak Ridge National Laboratory, and other top research institutions came to Utah under the program.

USTAR's research teams were internally focused in four areas: energy, life sciences, micro/nano systems, and big data industries. Research teams included the following groups:

Research Teams	Institution	Corresponding Markets
Arrhythmia Consortium	University of Utah/Utah State University	Electrolyte imbalance in blood, coronary artery disease
Alternative and Renewable Energy	University of Utah	Catalysis, solar energy technology
Applied Nutrition	Utah State University	Obesity, cardiovascular, diabetes, Alzheimer’s
Intuituive Building	Utah State University	Task-adaptive lighting solutions
Fossil Energy- Carbon Engineering	University of Utah	Carbon capture & sequestration for utilities
Nano-technology Biosensors	University of Utah	Cancer tests for early detection and treatment
Diagnostic Neuroimaging	University of Utah	Psychiatric diseases, Methamphetamine abuse
Imaging Technology	University of Utah	Early pathology treatment, drug evaluations
Biomedical Device Innovation	University of Utah	Targeted drug delivery to treat cancer
Micro & Nano Systems Integration	University of Utah	Biomedical monitoring & analysis, drug delivery
Wireless Nanosystems	University of Utah	Wireless communication at the nano level
Synthetic Bio-Manufacturing	Utah State University	Pharmaceuticals, fuels, plastics
STORM	Utah State University	Accurate weather prediction
Circuits of the Brain	University of Utah	Down and Williams Syndrome
Digital Media	University of Utah	Film production, animation, online gaming, simulations
Nanoscale & Biomedical Photonic Imaging	University of Utah	High-resolution diagnostics at the cellular level
Veterinary Diagnostics and Infectious Disease(VDID)	Utah State University	Diagnostics and infectious disease
Space Weather	Utah State University	Telecommunications, aviation, space
Wireless Power Transfer	Utah State University	Wireless energy and power conversion

==== USTAR University Research Facilities ====
Senate Bill 75 also called for the construction of research facilities at both the University of Utah and Utah State University, specifically the James L. Sorenson Molecular Biotechnology Building (UofU) and the BioInnovations Center (USU). The buildings provided research teams with advanced facilities aimed at innovation and commercialization of their respective focus areas. Funding for the projects came in March 2006 when State legislators created a $160 million USTAR building fund. The universities were provided a $40 million match, bringing the entire building budget to $200 million. The USTAR legislation required both of the research universities to donate land and make significant contributions towards the cost of the building prior to construction.

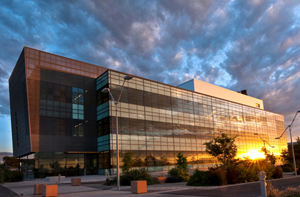
BioInnovation Building

===== Utah State University =====
Utah State University's Synthetic Biomanufacturing Facility was completed in October 2010. The Construction Manager General Contractor (CMGC) for the building at USU was Gramoll Construction and the Architectural & Engineering (AE) firm was AJC Architects. Payette Associates designed most of the lab space, including a Bio Safety Level 3+ lab, a vivarium, a clinical nutrition center, and life science labs. The building is located in the USU Innovation Campus in North Logan, Utah.

===== University of Utah =====
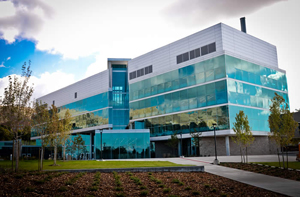
Sorenson Molecular Biotechnology Building

University of Utah's Sorenson Molecular Biotechnology Building was dedicated April 19, 2012. The 208,000 square-foot facility includes labs for nanofabrication, small animal imaging, optical imaging, neurosciences, biotechnology, as well as a vivarium and data center. The building is located between lower and upper campus and act as a central unifier between the work in the College of Engineering and the Health and Medical School. USTAR and the U of U obtained LEED certification for the building.

=== 2015-2017: Senate Bill 166 ===
After an audit by the Utah Legislature in 2014, SRI International was hired to conduct an independent, third-party study on the efficacy of USTAR. In 2015, SRI International wrote a prospectus outlining the five-year, projected direct impact of USTAR’s programs.

This prospectus served as the foundation of Senate Bill 166, which changed USTAR’s statute to better align with statewide economic development needs. Most notably, through SB166, USTAR was mandated to create new competitive grant programs to researchers and entrepreneurs statewide.

=== 2018-current: Senate Bill 239 ===
During the 2018 legislative session, Senate Bill 239 made additionally modifications to the USTAR statute and scope of work. Under these modifications, the principal researcher program was ended, transferring these programs to their respective universities. Additionally, it included the ownership transfer for USTAR buildings located on campuses to their respective universities. This was completed prior to October 1, 2018.

== USTAR Incubation Enterprise ==
USTAR’s incubation enterprise supports commercialization and economic development activities statewide through incubation and entrepreneurship services that are designed to develop innovative ideas into commercially viable technology.

These services and incubation centers include:

=== USTAR SBIR Center ===
Located at the Salt Lake Community College’s Miller Campus in Sandy, Utah, the SBIR Center assists qualified Utah businesses in finding and applying for federal Small Business Innovation Research (SBIR) and Small Business Technology Transfer (STTR) funds coordinated by the Small Business Administration. The center provides training and workshops as well as assistance with writing and editing proposals, registering with federal agencies, application submission, and more.

The center’s key impact metric is its success rate. The win rate for companies that receive assistance from the SBIR is 25 percent, compared to the 15 percent success rate nationally for National Science Foundation SBIR Phase I grants and the 15.6% success rate for National Institutes of Health SBIR Phase I grants.

In CY 2017, companies that received assistance from the SBIR Center reported $39.3 million in follow-on investment, $1.1 million in sales of commercialized products, and 50 new hires with salaries that exceeded the county average.

The USTAR SBIR Center won the prestigious Tibbets Award in 2016. The annual award, which is awarded by the SBA, honors small firms, projects, organizations, and individuals that have demonstrated socio-economic and technological impact and exemplify the very best in SBIR achievements.

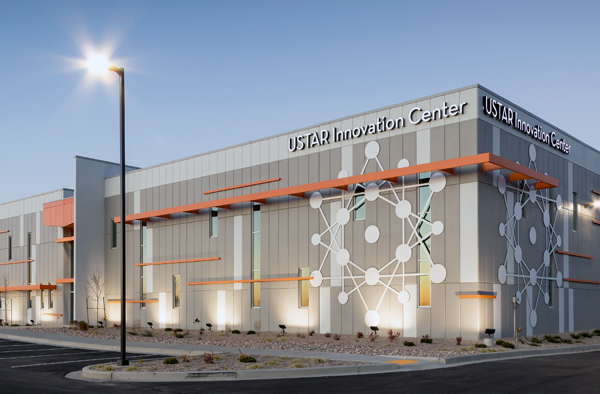
The USTAR Innovation Center in Clearfield, UT.

=== USTAR Innovation Center ===
Completed in November 2017, the USTAR Innovation Center is located at Falcon Hill National Aerospace Research Park outside of Hill Air Force Base in Clearfield, Utah. The incubation space accelerates the development cycle for seed and early-stage science and technology companies in Utah, drastically reducing initial overhead costs for startups.

The space helps to drive down costs and increase efficiency for prototyping, shortening the development cycle, which in turn makes companies ready for outside investment sooner than traditional lab spaces. This high-tech incubator and prototype lab space is designed to meet the needs of the entrepreneurs and early-stage companies, as well as strategic partners, in the aerospace/ defense, advanced materials, composites, and outdoor product sectors.

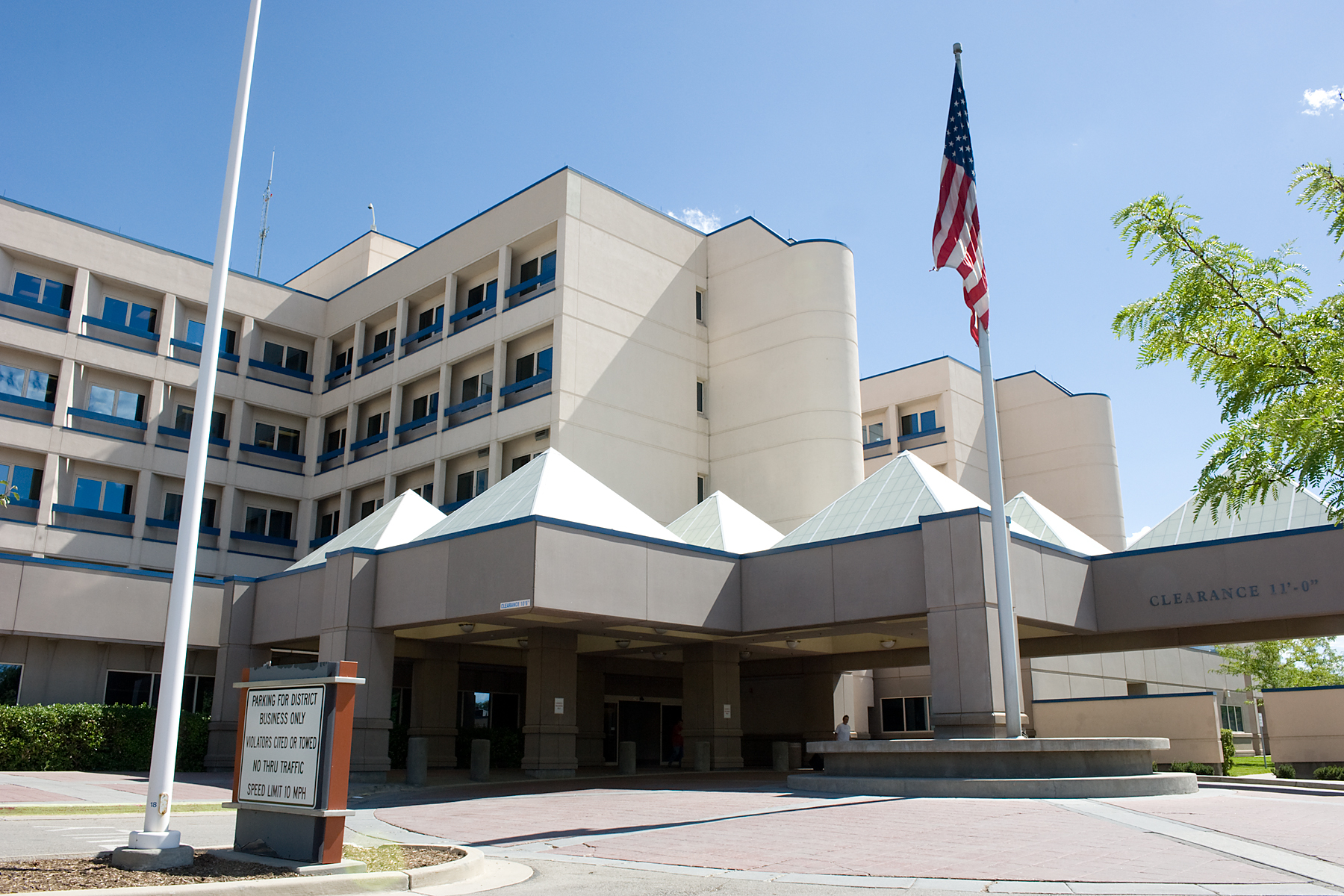
The BioInnovations Gateway

=== BioInnovations Gateway ===
Located within the Granite Technical Institute (GTI) in Salt Lake City, the BioInnovations Gateway (BiG) project combines business incubation with workforce development. Up to seven companies will access biotech and engineering equipment used in the biomanufacturing and biotechnology programs of Salt Lake Community College (SLCC) and Granite School District.

BiG offers biotech start-up businesses and students shared facilities, equipment, technical resources, and talent. The three primary objectives of BiG are:

- To provide early-stage life science companies a cost-effective competitive edge by sharing space, equipment, and talent.
- To train outstanding students to develop creative thinking skills in a product-driven environment. Participating BiG students will earn degree credit at GTI, SLCC, or Utah Valley University.
- To offer third-party contract research services.

BiG opened on October 27, 2009 and is primarily funded through federal grants and the GSD for the first three years, after which the goal is to become self-sustaining.

== Competitive Grant Programs ==
USTAR’s several competitive grant programs are designed to provide critical funding for university researchers and early-stage technology companies. Grants are focused on companies and technologies in the following sectors: aerospace, automation & robotics, big data & cybersystems, energy & clean technology and life sciences.

=== Technology Acceleration Program (TAP) Grant ===
TAP provides emerging private-sector technology companies with capital during the seed and early-stage phases. The program is targeted to help bridge the gap between research & development and a product’s commercial application in the marketplace.

TAP projects must be at a Technology Readiness Level (TRL) 3 to 5.

Since the launch of the pilot round of grants in CY2016, USTAR has awarded 45 grants to-date. These companies, as of June 2018, have secured $28,495,958 in follow-in funding and created 148 full- and part-time jobs. Furthermore, reported commercialized sales grew from $30,000 to $1.48 million in CY2017.

=== Industry Partnership Program (IPP) Grant ===
IPP partners Utah-based private sector technology companies with universities to address specific technology gaps identified by the company for further research and development. The program gives companies a market advantage, provides researchers insight commercial applications and helps educate future technical workers.

=== University Technology Acceleration Grant (UTAG) ===
UTAG provides university researchers with capital during advanced stages of applied research and development. The program is designed to de-risk or advance the maturity of technology that has been developed in the university lab setting to catalyze the technology toward commercialization.

UTAG is open to individual researchers or ad-hoc teams employed by nonprofit Utah-based colleges or universities.

== Utah Technology Innovation Summit ==
On June 6, 2018, USTAR hosted the inaugural Utah Technology Innovation Summit at the Salt Lake Marriott Downtown at City Creek. The sold-out summit focused on technology innovation policy with discussions led by government officials such as Utah lieutenant governor Spencer J. Cox and Salt Lake City Mayor Ben McAdams. Former Massachusetts governor and 2012 Republican Party nominee for President Mitt Romney provided the keynote address. The event cumulated with the presentation of the 31st Annual Governor's Medals for Science and Technology presented by Governor Gary R. Hebert.

The next summit is scheduled to take place in spring 2019.

== Governor's Medals for Science and Technology ==
Founded in 1987, the Governor's Medals for Science and Technology is the highest civilian award bestowed by the governor of Utah for significant achievement or contribution to the state in the fields of science or technology. The award and nomination process is overseen by USTAR. A panel of industry experts and educators review the nominations and make recommendations to the governor for final approval.

The medals are presented annually at the Utah Technology Innovation Summit.

== Funding ==
For FY18, USTAR’s total base budget was $22.1M. The largest portion of the budget, $10.1 million, went to support competitive grant programs. One third of the budget, or $7.0 million, funded principal researchers at the University of Utah and Utah State University. The remaining budget paid for technology entrepreneur services (15%), administration (3%), and program management and compliance costs (5%).

SB2319, which passed in March 2018, eliminated $6,519,000 in ongoing funding for USTAR supported principal researchers in FY2019. Additional budget changes included an $850,000 reduction to the UTAG program and a $27,000 reduction to USTAR support programs.

USTAR's base budget in FY2019 is $14 million and represents only 2.5 percent of current economic development expenditures by the state of Utah. USTAR makes up just .09% of the FY2019 state budget.

== Organization and operations ==
The USTAR Governing Authority is a 9-member team with experience in invention, entrepreneurship, financial capital, university research, and running and growing companies.

Current Governing Authority members include the following:

Name	Board Position	Organization	Job Title
Susan Opp	Chair	L3 Technologies	Senior Vice President, Strategy and Technology
Val Hale	Vice-Chair	Utah Governor's Office of Economic Development	Executive Director
David Damschen		State of Utah	Utah State Treasurer
Theresa A. Foxley		EDCUtah	President & CEO
Jennifer Hwu, Ph.D.		Innosys	President, CEO & Co-Founder
Richard Kendall		Education First, Prosperity 2020	Co-Chair (Education First) Advisor (Prosperity 2020)
Rich Lunsford		Edwards Lifesciences	Corporate Vice President, Cardiac Surgery Systems
Derek Miller		Salt Lake Chamber	President & CEO
Brigham Tomco		Zylun Global	Chairman & CEO

The USTAR staff is composed of technology incubation enterprise personnel located throughout the state and headquarters personnel. USTAR's staff includes a mix of scientific and technical domain expertise, strong program management and community outreach skills, and prior academic, government lab, and industry work experience. USTAR is one of Utah's efficiently run government organizations. n a study of 10 peer technology-based economy organizations across the United States, USTAR ranks last for average compensation (salaries and benefit) per employee. Furthermore, the same evaluation found that USTAR's total staff size, average salaries and benefits, and total personnel expenditures are average or below average when compared to peer organizations in the state, including. the Governor’s Office of Management and Budget (GOMB), the Governor’s Office of Economic Development (GOED), and the Governor’s Office of Energy Development (OED).

== Economic impact ==
Over the course of CY2016 and CY2017, USTAR client companies have raised $123.1 million in follow-on investment, generated $27 million in commercialized product sales, and created 424 full-time and part-time jobs. 263 of these jobs, or approximately 62 percent, are high-quality jobs that exceed the county average salary.

USTAR is on pace to meet or exceed its five-year performance metrics, as determined by its 2020 project performance metrics outlined by SRI International, in less than three years. Over the course of CY2016 and CY2017, USTAR had the following economic impact results:

Performance Metric	2016-2017 Actual Impact Data	2020 Projected Impact Data
Follow-on Investment	$123.1 million	$123.9 million
Sales	$27.0 million	$27.6 million
Full-Time Jobs Created	258	200
