= Blake Freeland =

American football player (born 2001)

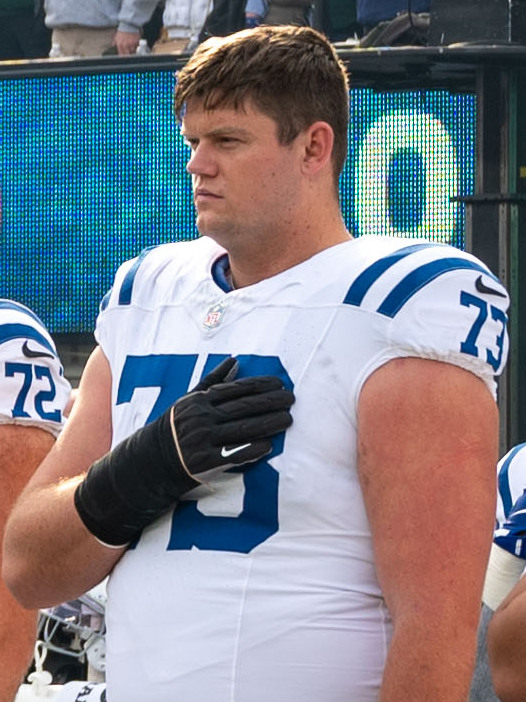
- Freeland with the Indianapolis Colts in 2024

No. 76 – New York Jets
- Position: Offensive tackle
- Roster status: Active

Personal information
- Born: May 3, 2001 (age 25); Herriman, Utah, U.S.
- Listed height: 6 ft 7 in (2.01 m)
- Listed weight: 302 lb (137 kg)

Career information
- High school: Herriman
- College: BYU (2019–2022)
- NFL draft: 2023: 4th round, 106th overall pick

Career history
- Indianapolis Colts (2023–2025); Cincinnati Bengals (2026)*; New York Jets (2026–present)
- * Offseason or practice squad member only

Awards and highlights
- Third-team All-American (2022)

Career NFL statistics as of 2025
- Games played: 25
- Games started: 9
- Stats at Pro Football Reference

Blake Freeland (born May 3, 2001) is an American professional football offensive tackle for the New York Jets of the National Football League (NFL). He played college football for the BYU Cougars.

== Early life and college ==
Freeland was born in Herriman, Utah. He played football at Herriman High School, where he played quarterback his sophomore and junior year and tight end and defensive end as a senior. Freeland then attended Brigham Young University, where he played college football for the Cougars from 2019 to 2022.

== Professional career ==
Freeland holds an NFL Combine record for an offensive lineman with a 37" vertical jump.

Pre-draft measurables
Height	Weight	Arm length	Hand span	Wingspan	40-yard dash	10-yard split	20-yard split	20-yard shuttle	Three-cone drill	Vertical jump	Broad jump	Bench press
6 ft 7 7/8 in (2.03 m)	302 lb (137 kg)	33 7/8 in (0.86 m)	10 in (0.25 m)	6 ft 9 7/8 in (2.08 m)	4.98 s	1.68 s	2.84 s	4.42 s	7.34 s	37.0 in (0.94 m)	10 ft 0 in (3.05 m)	25 reps
All values from NFL Combine/Pro Day

=== Indianapolis Colts ===
Freeland was selected by the Indianapolis Colts in the fourth round, 106th overall, of the 2023 NFL draft. He started his first NFL game on October 1, 2023, following an injury to Colts starting left tackle Bernhard Raimann. After two starts at left tackle, he started seven of the final 12 games at right tackle in place of an injured Braden Smith.

On August 18, 2025, Freeland was placed on season-ending injured reserve.

On August 30, 2026, Freeland was waived by the Colts as a part of final roster cuts.

=== Cincinnati Bengals ===
On September 1, 2026, Freeland signed with the Cincinnati Bengals' practice squad.

=== New York Jets ===
On November 3, 2026, Freeland was signed by the New York Jets off of the Bengals' practice squad.

== Personal life ==
Freeland's father, Jim, played linebacker at BYU in the 1990s. Freeland’s mother, Debbie (Diamond) Freeland, played Basketball and Volleyball at BYU in the 1990’s.
