= Brandon Sly =

American basketball player (born 1996)

No. 71 – Zlatibor
- Position: Point guard
- League: KLS; ABA 2

Personal information
- Born: 29 August 1996 (age 30) Los Angeles, United States
- Listed height: 1.82 m (6 ft 0 in)
- Listed weight: 155 lb (70 kg)

Career information
- High school: Riverton
- College: Utah State University (2014–2016); Adams State University (2016–2018)
- Playing career: 2019–present

Career history
- 2019–2020: BC Vera Tbilisi
- 2020–2021: TSU Tbilisi
- 2021–2022: CSM Târgu Jiu
- 2022–2023: KTP Basket
- 2023: Bornova Belediye
- 2023–2024: Podgorica
- 2024: MZT Skopje
- 2024–2025: Cedevita Junior
- 2026: Heroes Den Bosch
- 2026: Čačak 94
- 2026–present: Zlatibor

Brandon Demitre Sly (born 29 August 1996) is an American professional basketball player who plays for Zlatibor of the KLS.

== Professional career ==
On November 13, 2023, he made his debut in ABA League Second Division for Podgorica against GKK Šibenka where he scored 13 points On 10 July 2024, Sly signed a contract with MZT Skopje of the Macedonian League for the 2024–25 season.
