= Andre James =

American football player (born 1997)

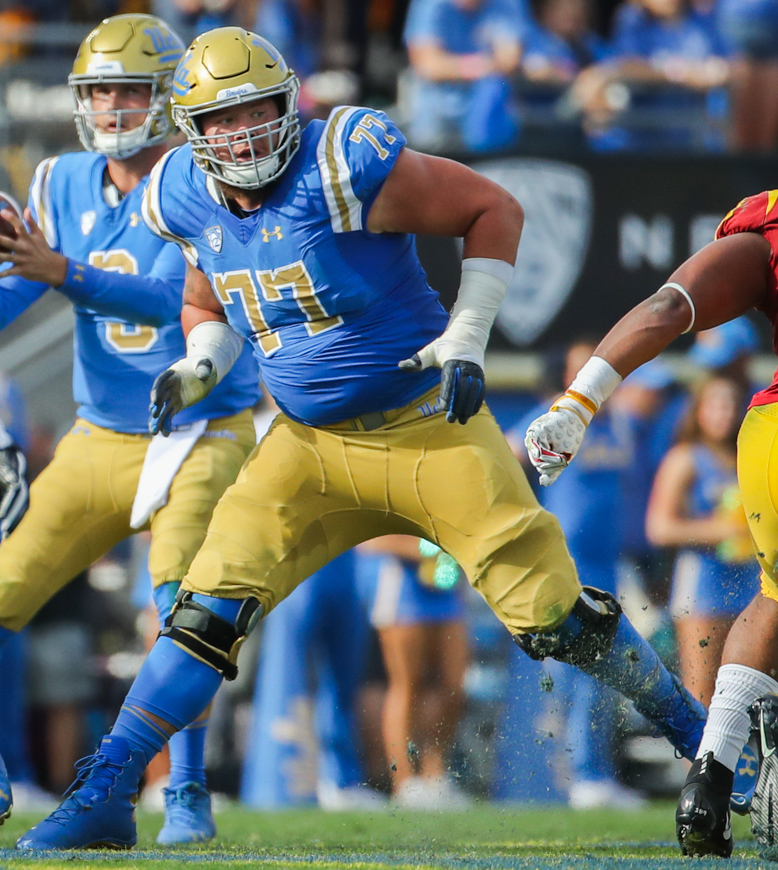
- James with the UCLA Bruins in 2018

Profile
- Position: Center

Personal information
- Born: May 2, 1997 (age 29); Herriman, Utah, U.S.
- Listed height: 6 ft 4 in (1.93 m)
- Listed weight: 300 lb (136 kg)

Career information
- High school: Herriman
- College: UCLA (2015–2018)
- NFL draft: 2019: undrafted

Career history
- Oakland / Las Vegas Raiders (2019–2024); Los Angeles Chargers (2025); Tennessee Titans (2026)*; Baltimore Ravens (2026)*
- * Offseason or practice squad member only

Career NFL statistics as of 2026
- Games played: 106
- Games started: 61
- Stats at Pro Football Reference

Andre James (born May 2, 1997) is an American professional football center. He played college football for the UCLA Bruins, before signing as an undrafted free agent with Oakland Raiders in 2019.

== Early life ==
James grew up in South Jordan, Utah, and attended Herriman High School, where he was a member of the football and track and field teams. He was named first-team All-State as a senior at offensive tackle. James was also a three time class 5A state champion in the shot put. He was rated a four-star recruit and committed to play college football at UCLA over offers from Oregon, USC, Ohio State, Oklahoma and Utah.

== College career ==
James was a member of the UCLA Bruins, redshirting his true freshman season. He became a starter during his redshirt freshman season following an injury to Kolton Miller. James started the final 32 games of his collegiate career, appearing in 35 games total. As a redshirt junior, he made the decision to play in the Bruins' week seven game against Arizona and continue his consecutive games started streak despite his father dying of cancer earlier that week. James declared for the NFL Draft on December 18, 2018, forgoing his final season of NCAA eligibility.

== Professional career ==
Pre-draft measurables
Height	Weight	Arm length	Hand span	Wingspan	40-yard dash	10-yard split	20-yard split	20-yard shuttle	Three-cone drill	Vertical jump	Broad jump	Bench press
6 ft 4 1/8 in (1.93 m)	299 lb (136 kg)	32 in (0.81 m)	10 in (0.25 m)	6 ft 8 1/4 in (2.04 m)	5.32 s	1.80 s	3.05 s	4.84 s	8.00 s	29.0 in (0.74 m)	8 ft 9 in (2.67 m)	21 reps
All values from Pro Day

=== Oakland / Las Vegas Raiders ===
James signed with the Oakland Raiders as an undrafted free agent on May 3, 2019. He was reunited with UCLA offensive tackle Kolton Miller. James made his NFL debut on September 9, against the Denver Broncos. He made his first career start at center in Week 9 in place of the injured Rodney Hudson. James appeared in 12 games (including one start) for Oakland as a rookie.

On March 22, 2021, the Raiders signed James to a three-year, $12.5 million contract extension through the 2023 season. He was the full-time starting center for all three seasons.

On March 11, 2024, James signed a three-year, $24 million contract extension with the Raiders.

James was released by the Raiders on March 12, 2025.

=== Los Angeles Chargers ===
James signed with the Los Angeles Chargers on March 18, 2025.

=== Tennessee Titans ===
On June 16, 2026, James signed with the Tennessee Titans. On August 30, he was placed on injured reserve before the start of the regular season. James was released by the Titans on September 1.

=== Baltimore Ravens ===
James signed with the Baltimore Ravens' practice squad on September 30, 2026, after the Ravens lost both of their centers to long-term injuries. He was released on October 22.
