= Jordan Academy for Technology and Careers =

U.S. career and technical school in Utah

The Jordan Academy for Technology and Careers (often abbreviated to JATC), is the career and technical school owned and operated by the Jordan School District. It was formerly known as the Jordan Applied Technology Center, receiving the change to the current name in 2015. It has campuses located in Riverton, Utah and on the Jordan Campus of Salt Lake Community College in West Jordan, Utah. It serves students throughout the school district, but is further available to students enrolled in high schools that are part of the Wasatch Front Consortium.
