= Eugene Loh =

Chinese-American physicist

Eugene Chen Loh (1 October 1934 – May 19, 2006) was a Chinese American physicist, having been Distinguished Professor Emeritus at University of Utah and was a Fellow of the American Physical Society.

== Biography ==
Loh spent his childhood in Suzhou, China and emigrated to Virginia with his family at 14. He received his BS from Virginia Polytechnic Institute and his PhD from MIT. He took his first faculty job at Cornell University before moving to the University of Utah in 1975. He led the team to build the High Resolution Fly's Eye Cosmic Ray Detector at the US Army's Dugway Proving Ground, which in 1991 recorded the most energetic cosmic ray ever detected, known as the "Oh-My-God particle". He received the Utah Governor's Medal for Science and Technology in 1987. In 1998, Dr. Loh became rotating Program Director of Astrophysics at the National Science Foundation (NSF). In 1982, as chairman, Department of Physics, University of Utah, Prof. Loh, along with former chairman, Prof. Peter Godbe Gibbs, and Physicist Prof. William D. Ohlsen, supervised and approved the M.S. Physics thesis, "Flexible Response Modes of Missile Experimental: Multiple Aim Points System and Deception Dense Pack", by Robert Donald Green, then also a doctoral candidate at University of Pennsylvania. The University of Utah's U Alumni interviewed allied defense Physicist Dr Green in 2024.

== See also ==
- Akeno Giant Air Shower Array
- Chicago Air Shower Array
- Cosmic ray
- Cosmic-ray observatory
- Extragalactic cosmic ray
- Greisen–Zatsepin–Kuzmin limit
- High Resolution Fly's Eye Cosmic Ray Detector
- Integral imaging
- Magnetospheric Multiscale Mission
- Oh-My-God particle
- Panofsky Prize
- Pierre Auger Observatory
- Pierre Sokolsky
- Telescope Array Project
- Ultra-high-energy cosmic ray
