= Jordan School District =

School district in Utah, United States

Location
- 7387 S Campus View Drive; West Jordan, UT 84084-2998 Southwestern part of Salt Lake County, Utah
- Coordinates: 40.606°N 111.936°W

District information
- Grades: K-12
- Established: 1905
- Superintendent: Dr. Anthony Godfrey
- Schools: 67 (2021-2022)
- Budget: 397,300,000 (2012-2013)
- NCES District ID: 4900420

Students and staff
- Students: 57,866
- Teachers: 3,364 (2021-2022)
- Staff: 3,092 (2021-2022)

Other information
- Website: http://www.jordandistrict.org

Jordan School District is a school district in the southwestern portion of Salt Lake County, Utah, United States. It now employs 3,364 teachers and other licensed personnel who educate more than 57,800 students. An additional 3,092 employees provide support services for the system. Jordan District was the largest in Utah until the Canyons School District in the southeastern portion of the county split in 2009. Boundaries for Jordan District now include the communities of Bluffdale, Copperton, Herriman, Riverton, South Jordan and most of West Jordan.

== History ==
The district was created in 1904 with 3,354 students. Its name and original boundaries were taken from the Jordan Stake of the LDS Church, which at the time spanned the breadth of the Salt Lake Valley from east to west, and the length of the valley from roughly Midvale to the south end of the valley.

When Jordan's east-side communities voted to break from the district and form their own, Jordan lost 44 of its 84 schools and a large part of its property tax base. This split caused a loss in property tax revenue; together with $16 million in state budget cuts, this created budget problems for the district. As of August 13, 2009, the district faced a $33 million shortfall. Jordan teachers lost nine days' pay, and were paid an average of 4.5 percent less in the 2009-2010 school year than they were paid in 2008-2009, and taxpayers faced a large property tax increase.

In early 2010, the Jordan district school board announced a $20 million shortfall caused by the loss of taxable property, and announced cuts that could slash teacher ranks, increase class sizes and impact extracurricular activities.

In 2015, the Washington Post reported that of the nation's largest school districts, the Jordan School District spent the least per student, $5,708. Utah is the state with the lowest spending per student, $6,555.

== Schools ==
=== High schools ===
- Bingham (South Jordan)
- Copper Hills (West Jordan)
- Herriman (Herriman, Utah)
- Kings Peak (Bluffdale)
- Mountain Ridge (Herriman, Utah)
- Riverton (Riverton)
- West Jordan (West Jordan)
- Valley (South Jordan)

=== Middle schools ===
- Copper Mountain (Herriman)
- Elk Ridge (South Jordan)
- Fort Herriman (Herriman)
- Hidden Valley (Bluffdale)
- Joel P. Jensen (West Jordan)
- Mountain Creek (South Jordan)
- Oquirrh Hills (Riverton)
- South Hills (Riverton)
- South Jordan (South Jordan)
- Sunset Ridge (West Jordan)
- West Hills (West Jordan)
- West Jordan (West Jordan)

=== Elementary schools ===
- Antelope Canyon (West Jordan)
- Aspen (South Jordan)
- Bastian (Herriman)
- Blackridge (Herriman)
- Bluffdale (Bluffdale)
- Butterfield Canyon (Herriman)
- Columbia (West Jordan)
- Copper Canyon (West Jordan)
- Daybreak (South Jordan)
- Eastlake (South Jordan)
- Elk Meadows (South Jordan)
- Falcon Ridge (West Jordan)
- Foothills (Riverton)
- Fox Hollow (West Jordan)
- Golden Fields (South Jordan)
- Hayden Peak (West Jordan), K-6, 1,200 students, established 1999.
- Heartland (West Jordan)
- Herriman (Herriman)
- Jordan Hills (West Jordan)
- Jordan Ridge (South Jordan)
- Juniper (Herriman), grades 4-6 only.
- Majestic Arts Academy (West Jordan)
- Midas Creek (Riverton)
- Monte Vista (South Jordan)
- Mountain Point (Bluffdale)
- Mountain Shadows (West Jordan)
- Oakcrest (West Jordan)
- Oak Leaf (Herriman)
- Oquirrh (West Jordan)
- Ridge View (Herriman)
- Riverside (West Jordan)
- Riverton (Riverton)
- Rocky Peak (Bluffdale)
- Rosamond (Riverton)
- Rose Creek (Riverton)
- Silver Crest (Herriman)
- South Jordan (South Jordan)
- Southland (Riverton)
- Terra Linda (West Jordan)
- Welby (South Jordan)
- Westland (West Jordan)
- Westvale (West Jordan)

=== Technical schools ===
- Jordan Academy for Technology and Careers - North Campus (West Jordan)
- Jordan Academy for Technology and Careers - South Campus (Riverton)

=== Special schools ===
- Kauri Sue Hamilton (Riverton, Utah)
- River's Edge (South Jordan, Utah)
- South Valley (West Jordan)

=== Adult educational programs ===
- Southpointe Adult High (West Jordan, Utah)

== See also ==
- List of the largest school districts in the United States by enrollment
