= Light intensity =

Several measures of light are commonly known as intensity:

- Radiant intensity, a radiometric quantity measured in watts per steradian (W/sr)
- Luminous intensity, a photometric quantity measured in lumens per steradian (lm/sr), or candela (cd)
- Irradiance, a radiometric quantity, measured in watts per square meter (W/m^{2})
  - Intensity (physics), the name for irradiance used in other branches of physics (W/m^{2})
- Radiance, commonly called "intensity" in astronomy and astrophysics (W·sr^{−1}·m^{−2})

== See also ==
- Brightness, the subjective perception elicited by the luminance of a source
- Luminance, the photometric equivalent of radiance (lm·sr^{−1}·m^{−2})
- Photometry (optics), measurement of light, in terms of its perceived brightness to the human eye
- Radiometry, measurement of light, in absolute power units
- Luminosity
