= Mountain Ridge High School (Utah) =

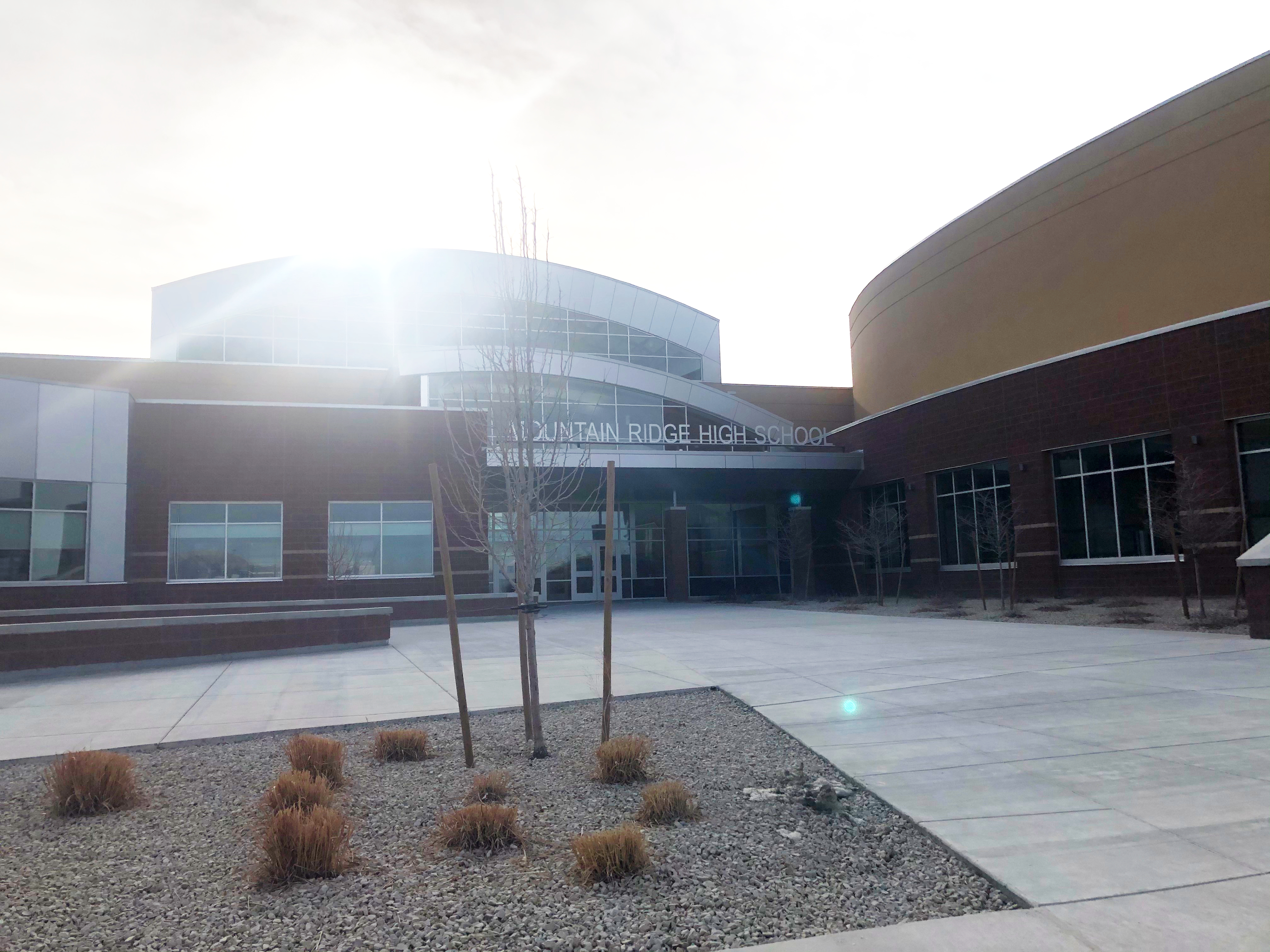

Location
- 14100 South Sentinel Ridge Blvd. Herriman, Utah 84096; United States; 40.4948°N 111.9977°W

Information
- Type: Public secondary school
- Established: 20 August 2019
- School district: Jordan School District
- NCES District ID: 4900420
- NCES School ID: 490042001525
- Principal: Brady Bartholomew
- Teaching staff: 106.70 (on an FTE basis)
- Grades: Preschool, 10-12
- Enrollment: 2,598 (2023-2024)
- Student to teacher ratio: 24.35
- Colors: Scarlet, gray and white
- Mascot: Sentinels
- Website: Official website

Mountain Ridge High School is a public high school in Herriman, Utah. It serves students in grades 10-12 for the Jordan School District.

== History ==
The intent to build the school was announced by the Jordan School District in 2016. Ground was broken in 2017. The school cost $82 million to build.

Mountain Ridge High School opened in the fall of 2019.

== Athletics ==
Mountain Ridge participates in sports sanctioned by the Utah High School Activities Association. The school's mascot is the Sentinels. The school competes in Region 2 of class 6A and the colors are scarlet red, gray, and white. The following sports are offered:

- Baseball (boys)
- Basketball (girls & boys)
- Cross Country (girls & boys)
- Football (boys)
- Golf (girls & boys)
- Lacrosse (girls & boys)
- Soccer (girls & boys)
- Softball (girls)
- Tennis (girls & boys)
- Track & Field (girls & boys)
- Volleyball (girls & boys)
- Wrestling (girls & boys)
- Swim (co-ed)

== Notable alumni ==
- Cade Uluave, college football linebacker for the California Golden Bears

== See also ==
- List of high schools in Utah
