= Herriman, Utah =

City in Utah, United States

- City
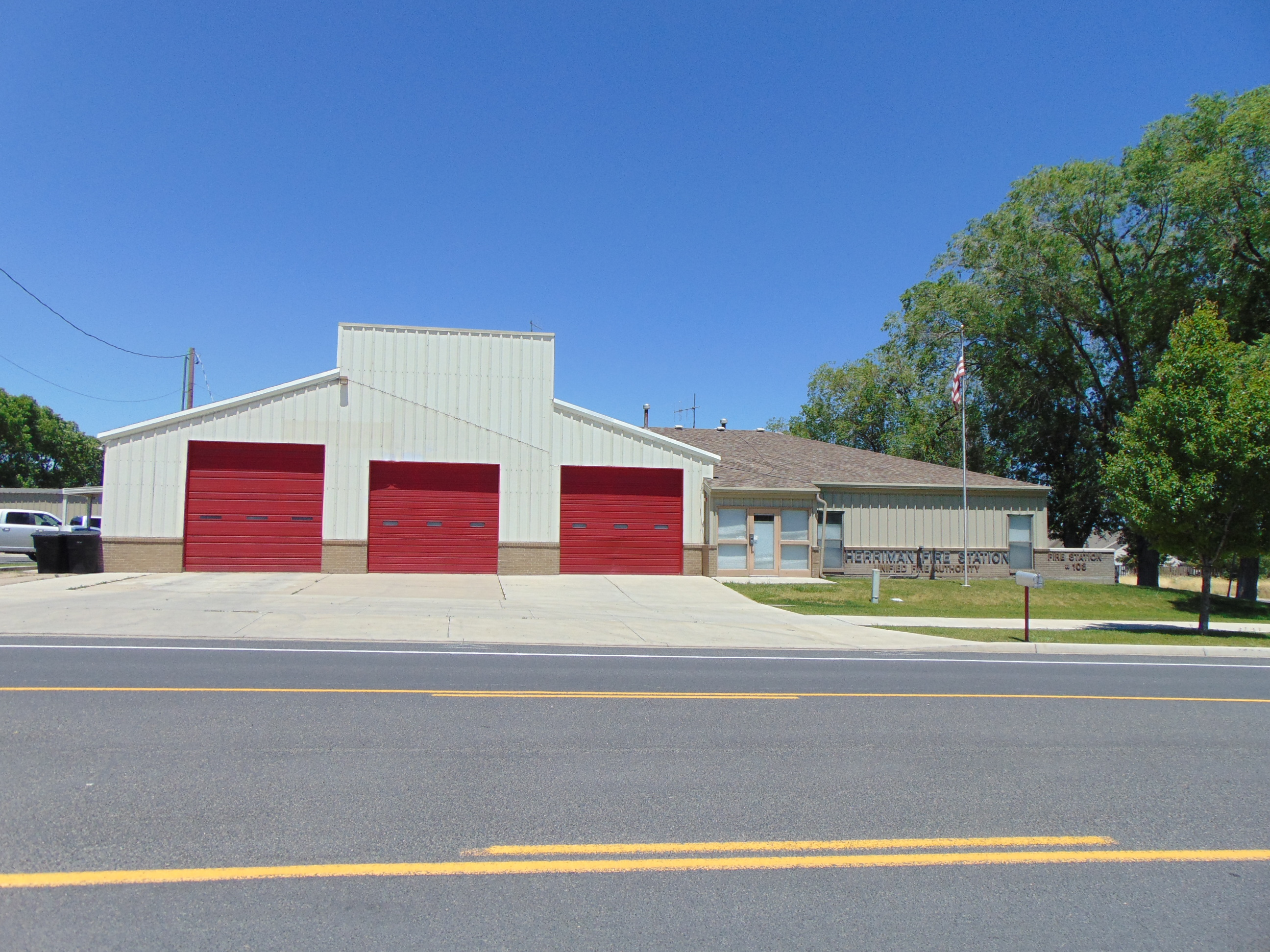
- Unified Fire Authority Station 103, located on Main Street

- Location in Salt Lake County and the state of Utah
- Coordinates: 40°30′24″N 112°1′51″W
- Country: United States
- State: Utah
- County: Salt Lake
- Settled: 1851
- Incorporated: 1999
- Became a city: April 19, 2001
- Founder: Thomas Butterfield
- Named for: Henry Harriman

Government
  - Type: Mayor-Council
  - Mayor: Lorin Palmer

Area
  - Total: 23.11 sq mi (59.86 km^{2})
  - Land: 23.11 sq mi (59.86 km^{2})
  - Water: 0 sq mi (0.00 km^{2})
- Elevation: 5,000 ft (1,524 m)

Population (2020)
  - Total: 55,144
  - Density: 2,386/sq mi (921.2/km^{2})
- Time zone: UTC-7 (Mountain)
  - Summer (DST): UTC-6 (Mountain)
- ZIP code: 84096
- Area codes: 385, 801
- FIPS code: 49-34970
- GNIS feature ID: 1428675
- Website: herriman.gov

Herriman (/ˈhɛrɪmən/ HERR-ih-mən) is a city in the Salt Lake City metropolitan area, located in southwestern Salt Lake County, Utah. The population was 55,144 as of the 2020 census. Although Herriman was a town in 2000, it has since been classified as a third-class city by state law. The city has experienced rapid growth since incorporation in 1999, as its population was just 1,523 at the 2000 census. It grew from being the 111th-largest incorporated place in Utah in 2000 to the 14th-largest in 2020.

== History ==
Herriman was established in 1851 by Henry Harriman, Thomas Jefferson Butterfield, John Jay Stocking, and Robert Cowan Petty. A fort was established where the community garden is today. The only remnants of Fort Herriman are two black locust trees that stand near the entry to the old fort.

Herriman remained a small community until 1999, when concerned citizens went door to door asking people to sign a petition to be incorporated into a town. In 1998 Rose Creek Estates, developed by Watt Homes, started the first "subdivision" with the property under 1 acre. Later, Rosecrest, a land developer who acquired some rights in a large area around Herriman, started large-scale residential development. Rosecrest is owned by parent company Sorenson Companies, founded by the late James LeVoy Sorenson. In 2007, Rosecrest won a lawsuit with partner land owners/developers that allowed about 4,000 acres (16 km^{2}) to be annexed out of neighboring city Bluffdale into Herriman to further expand the Rosecrest/Herriman housing projects. The lawsuit stemmed from a struggle between Bluffdale city officials, strict city building requirements, and Rosecrest. The addition of Rosecrest greatly increased Herriman's population and enabled the town to be turned into a city.

On September 19, 2010, the National Guard was performing an exercise at Camp Williams, south of Herriman, when a tracer bullet likely struck a rock, setting off a 3,500 acres (14 km^{2}) wildfire. Unified Fire Authority members mobilized and were able to arrest the progress of the fire, but not before three homes were destroyed and another damaged. Various small structures were also affected. Over 1,200 homes were evacuated in the face of the oncoming danger, with most of them able to return by Tuesday, September 21, 2010.

== Geography ==
According to the United States Census Bureau, the city has a total area of 23.1 square miles (60 km^{2}), all land. The city frequently annexes new areas west and east of its borders. The newest annexation was in 2022 when the 933-acre Olympia housing development was annexed on the west side of the city.

Herriman shares borders with Riverton to the east, South Jordan to the north, and Bluffdale to the southeast.

== Demographics ==
Historical population
Census	Pop.	Note	%±
2000	1,523		—
2010	21,785		1,330.4%
2020	55,144		153.1%

=== 2020 census ===
As of the 2020 census, Herriman had a population of 55,144. The median age was 26.5 years. 37.8% of residents were under the age of 18 and 4.2% of residents were 65 years of age or older. For every 100 females there were 99.3 males, and for every 100 females age 18 and over there were 97.5 males age 18 and over.

97.1% of residents lived in urban areas, while 2.9% lived in rural areas.

There were 15,360 households in Herriman, of which 59.5% had children under the age of 18 living in them. Of all households, 69.6% were married-couple households, 10.7% were households with a male householder and no spouse or partner present, and 14.3% were households with a female householder and no spouse or partner present. About 10.5% of all households were made up of individuals and 1.8% had someone living alone who was 65 years of age or older.

There were 16,276 housing units, of which 5.6% were vacant. The homeowner vacancy rate was 1.1% and the rental vacancy rate was 14.5%.

Racial composition as of the 2020 census
Race	Number	Percent
White	44,791	81.2%
Black or African American	536	1.0%
American Indian and Alaska Native	372	0.7%
Asian	1,315	2.4%
Native Hawaiian and Other Pacific Islander	674	1.2%
Some other race	2,584	4.7%
Two or more races	4,872	8.8%
Hispanic or Latino (of any race)	7,155	13.0%

=== 2010 census ===
As of the 2010 census, there were 21,785 people, 5,542 households, and 5,022 families residing in the town. The population density was 1075.0 people per square mile (64.5/km^{2}). There were 6,022 housing units at an average density of 297.2 per square mile (19.4/km^{2}). The racial makeup of the town was 93.3% White, 0.3% Native American, 1.3% Asian, 0.5% Pacific Islander, 0.3% from other races, and 2.3% from two or more races. Hispanic or Latino of any race were 6.2% of the population.

There were 5,542 households, out of which 44.1% had children under 18 living with them, 81.3% were married couples living together, 6.1% had a female householder with no husband present, and 9.4% were non-families. 6.5% of all households were made up of individuals, and 1.0% had someone living alone who was 65 years or older. The average household size was 3.93, and the average family size was 4.13.

In the town, the population was spread out, with 44.1% under 18, 6.1% from 18 to 24, 29.0% from 25 to 44, 11.7% from 45 to 64, and 2.6% who were 65 years of age or older. The median age was 24.7 years. For every 100 females, there were 102.4 males. For every 100 females aged 18 and over, there were 100.7 males.

The median income for a household in the town was $56,361, and the median income for a family was $57,404. Males had a median income of $44,135 versus $30,893 for females. The per capita income was $18,991. About 2.9% of families and 3.9% of the population were below the poverty line, including 5.7% of those under age 18 and none aged 65 or over.

== Education ==
Herriman has two high schools, Herriman High School, which opened in 2010, and Mountain Ridge High School, which opened in 2019. Herriman also is home to Fort Herriman Middle School and Copper Mountain Middle School. Elementary schools include Herriman, Butterfield Canyon, Silvercrest, Blackridge, Bastian, and Ridge View, which also opened in the 2019–2020 school year. In addition to the 6 elementary schools serving grades K–6, Juniper Elementary School serves grades 4–6 and was built to relieve crowding at Ridge View. Juniper Elementary is also designed to be easily converted into office spaces or a secondary school. All the public schools in Herriman are run by the Jordan School District.

Herriman also is home to five charter schools: Providence Hall High School, Providence Hall Junior High School, Providence Hall Elementary School, and Athlos Academy. Another, Advantage Arts Academy, was recently opened on 11800 S.

== Sports ==
Herriman is home to the Zions Bank Real Academy, a soccer complex that serves as the training facility for Real Salt Lake of Major League Soccer. The complex includes Zions Bank Stadium, a 5,000-seat stadium for MLS Next Pro affiliate Real Monarchs and the Utah Warriors of Major League Rugby.

== Public services ==
Herriman maintains most of its own services, including police, water, animal services, and roads. Herriman contracts with Rocky Mountain Power, Wasatch Waste and recycling, Enbridge (formerly Dominion) Energy, South Valley Sewer, and Unified Fire Authority.

Herriman is home to the Herriman Historical Committee, Be Ready Herriman, the Herriman Arts Council, Herriman Trails Committee, the Herriman Youth Council, and Healthy Herriman.

== Notable people ==
- Francis Bernard, football player
- Jeff Dewsnup, soccer player
- Blake Freeland, professional football player
- Henry Harriman, LDS leader
- Andre James, American football player
- Robert Kirby, humor columnist
- John Knotwell, former member of the Utah House of Representatives
- Edwin Mulitalo, NFL coach and former football player
- Rhyan White, swimmer
- Thomas Levi Whittle, Canadian farmer and early LDS figure

== See also ==
- List of cities and towns in Utah
