= University of Utah =

Public university in Salt Lake City, Utah, US

- Former name: University of Deseret (1850–1892)
- Motto: "Imagine, then Do"
- Type: Public research university
- Established: February 28, 1850; 176 years ago
- Parent institution: Utah System of Higher Education
- Accreditation: NWCCU
- Academic affiliations: AAU; ORAU; USTAR; space-grant
- Endowment: $2.07 billion (FY2025)
- President: Taylor R. Randall
- Provost: Mitzi Montoya
- Faculty: 4,463 (fall 2024) (Note: Includes full-time and part-time faculty)
- Total staff: 32,163 (fall 2024) (Note: Includes full-time and part-time staff for the university, medical school, and hospitals/clinics)
- Students: 36,881 (fall 2024)
- Undergraduates: 28,064 (fall 2024)
- Postgraduates: 8,817 (fall 2024)
- Location: Salt Lake City, Utah, United States; 40.7642°N 111.8465°W
- Campus: 1,534 acres (6.21 km^{2}); Midsize city
- Colors: Red and white
- Nicknames: Utes; Runnin' Utes; Red Rocks
- Sporting affiliations: NCAA Division I FBS – Big 12; MPSF; RMISA; ASUN
- Mascot: Swoop
- Website: www.utah.edu

The University of Utah (the U, U of U, or simply Utah) is a public research university in Salt Lake City, Utah, United States. It was established in 1850 as the University of Deseret by the General Assembly of the provisional State of Deseret, making it Utah's oldest institution of higher education. The university received its current name in 1892, four years before Utah attained statehood, and moved to its current location in 1900. It is the flagship university of the Utah System of Higher Education.

As of fall 2024, there were 28,064 undergraduate students and 8,817 graduate students, for an enrollment total of 36,881, making it the second-largest public university in Utah. Graduate and professional schools include the S.J. Quinney College of Law and the School of Medicine, Utah's first medical school. It is a member of the Association of American Universities (AAU) and is classified among "R1: Doctoral Universities – Very high research activity".

According to the National Science Foundation, the university received $723.7 million in research and development funding in fiscal year 2023, ranking it 47th in the nation. The university's health care system includes four hospitals, including the University of Utah Hospital and Huntsman Cancer Institute, along with twelve community clinics and specialty centers such as the Moran Eye Center. The university's athletic teams, the Utes, participate in NCAA Division I athletics (FBS for football) as a member of the Big 12 Conference.

In its history, twenty-two Rhodes Scholars, four Nobel Prize winners, three Turing Award winners, eight MacArthur Fellows, various Pulitzer Prize winners, two astronauts, Gates Cambridge Scholars, and Churchill Scholars have been affiliated with the university as students, researchers, or faculty members.

== History ==
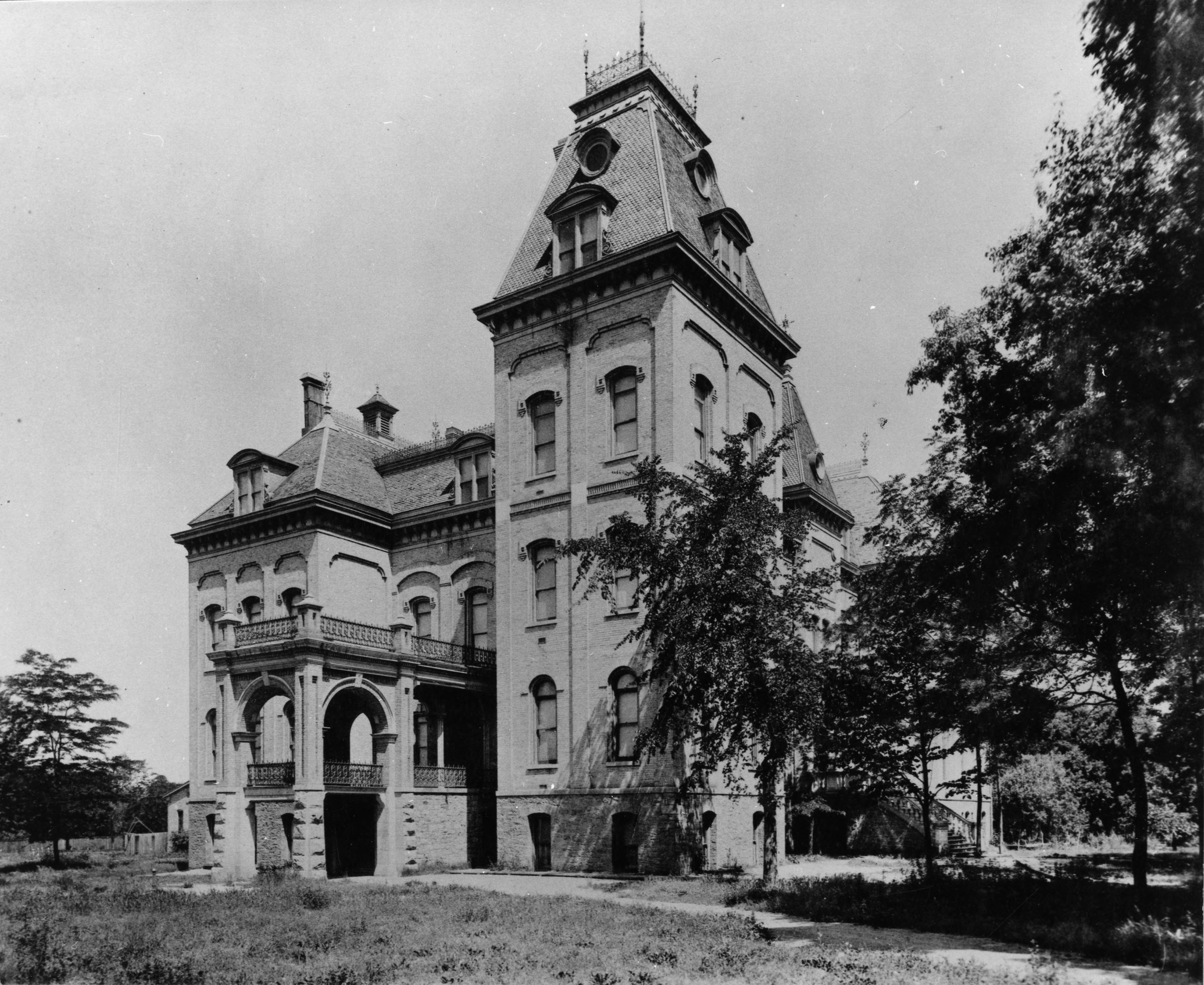
University Hall in Salt Lake City, the first permanent home of the University of Deseret (later the University of Utah)

Soon after the Mormon pioneers arrived in the Salt Lake valley in 1847, Brigham Young began organizing a Board of Regents to establish a university. The university was established on February 28, 1850, as the University of Deseret by the General Assembly of the provisional State of Deseret, and Orson Spencer was appointed as the first chancellor of the university. Early classes were held in private homes, or wherever space could be found. The university closed in 1853 due to a lack of funds and lack of feeder schools.

Following years of intermittent classes in the Salt Lake City Council House, the university began to be re-established in 1867 under the direction of David O. Calder, who was followed by John R. Park in 1869. The university moved out of the council house into the Union Academy building in 1876 and onto Union Square in 1884. In 1892, the school's name was changed to the University of Utah, and John R. Park began arranging to obtain land belonging to the U.S. Army's Fort Douglas on the east bench of the Salt Lake Valley, where the university moved permanently in 1900. Additional Fort Douglas land has been granted to the university over the years, and the fort was officially closed on October 26, 1991. Upon his death in 1900, Dr. John R. Park bequeathed his entire fortune to the university.

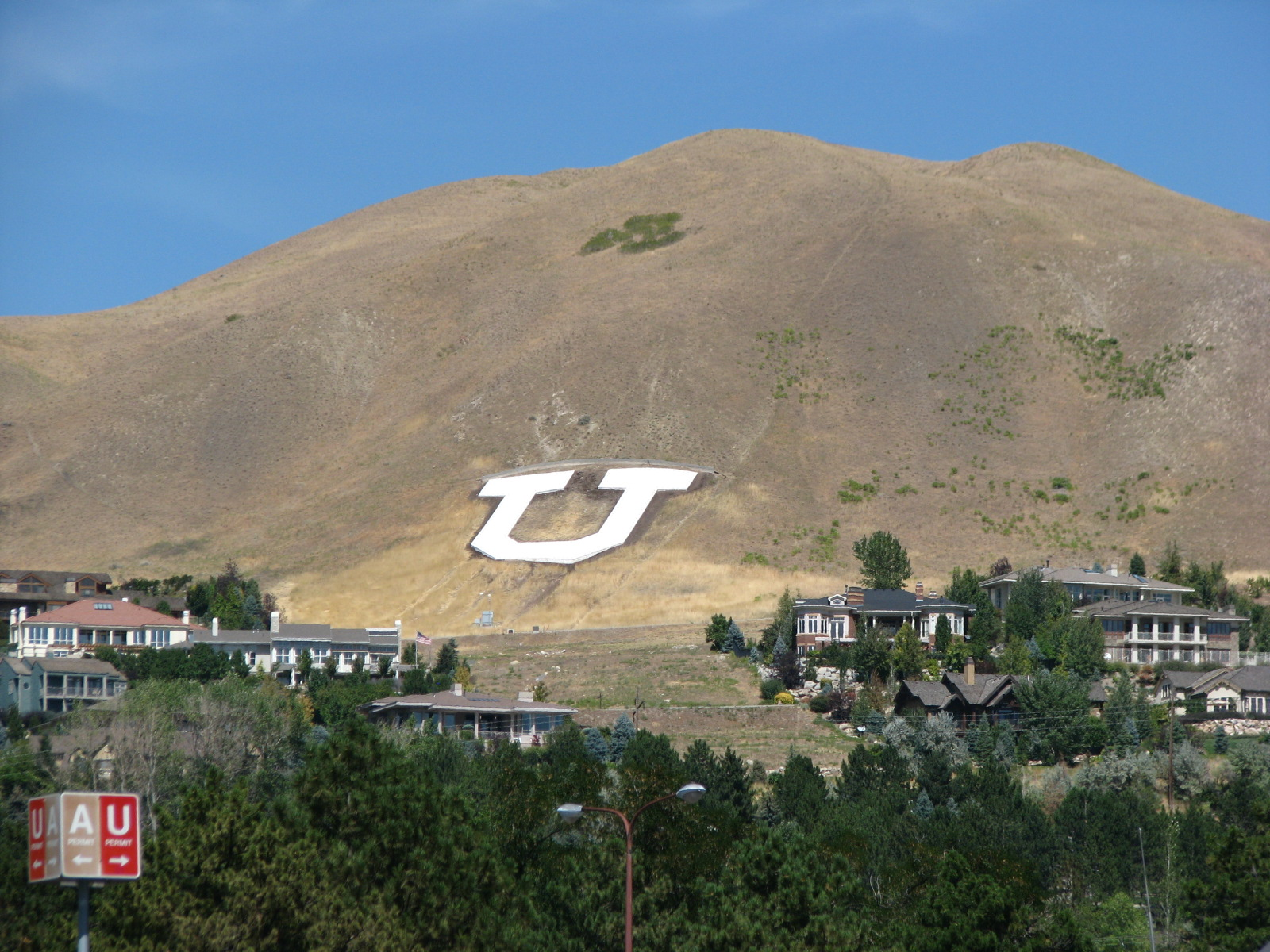
The Block U has overlooked the university since 1907.

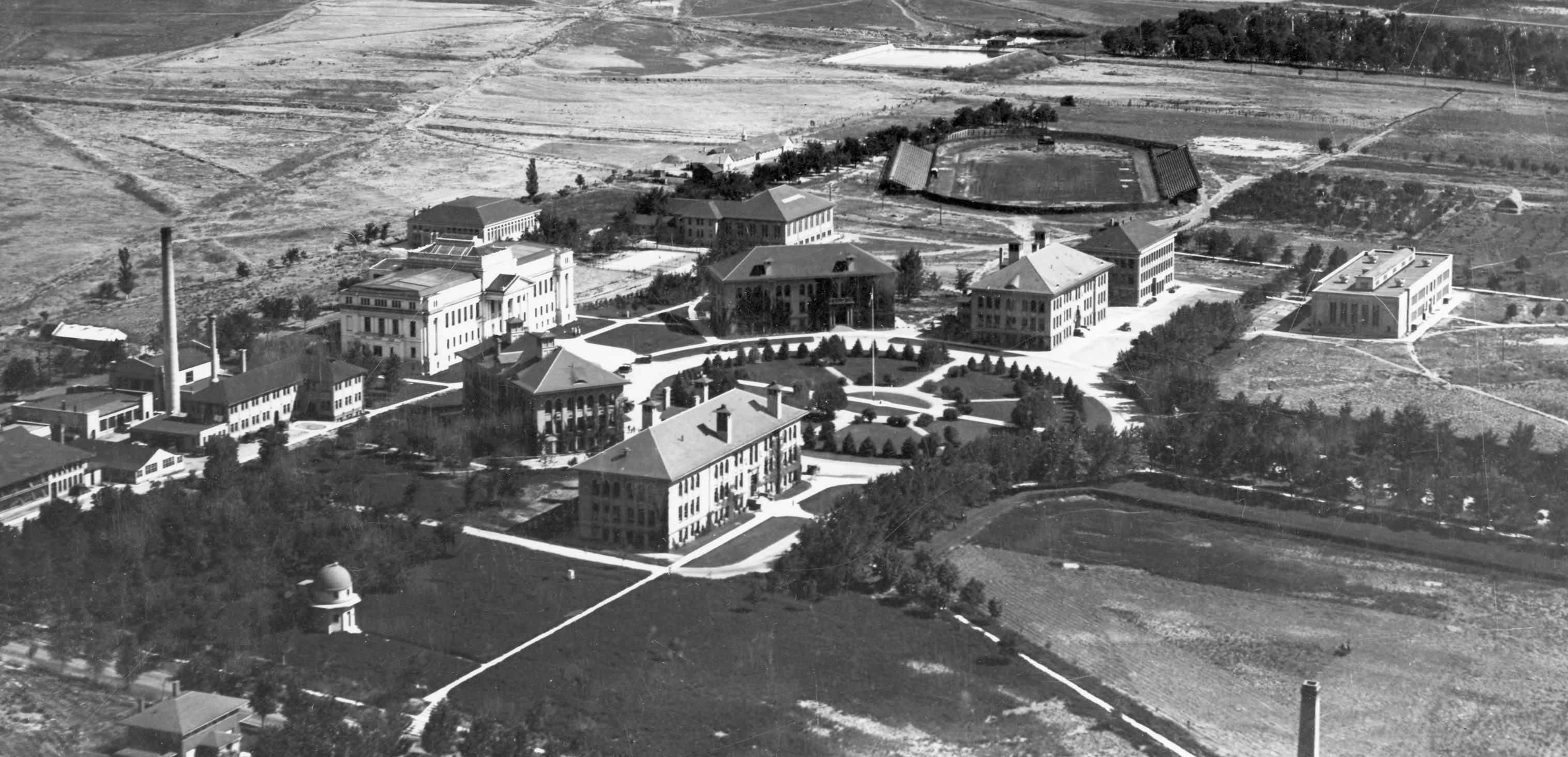
The University of Utah campus in the early 1920s

The university grew rapidly in the early 20th century but was involved in an academic freedom controversy in 1915 when Joseph T. Kingsbury recommended that five faculty members be dismissed after a graduation speaker made a speech critical of Utah governor William Spry. One third of the faculty resigned in protest of these dismissals. Some felt that the dismissals were a result of the Church of Jesus Christ of Latter-day Saints' influence on the university, while others felt that they reflected a more general pattern of repressing religious and political expression that might be deemed offensive. The controversy was largely resolved when Kingsbury resigned in 1916, but university operations were again interrupted by World War I, and later The Great Depression and World War II. Student enrollment dropped to a low of 3,418 during the last year of World War II, but A. Ray Olpin made substantial additions to campus following the war, and enrollment reached 12,000 by the time he retired in 1964. Growth continued in the following decades as the university developed into a research center for fields such as computer science and medicine.

During the 2002 Winter Olympics, the university hosted the Olympic Village, a housing complex for the Olympic and Paralympic athletes, as well as the opening and closing ceremonies. Multiple large improvements were made to the university prior to the events, including extensive renovations to the Rice–Eccles Stadium, a light rail line leading to downtown Salt Lake City, a new student center known as the Heritage Center, an array of new student housing, and what is now a 180-room campus hotel and conference center.

The University of Utah Asia Campus opened as an international branch campus in the Incheon Global Campus in Songdo, Incheon, South Korea in 2014. Three other European and American universities are also participating. The Asia Campus was funded by the South Korean government.

In 2015, the university helped open the Ensign College of Public Health in Kpong, Ghana.

In 2019, the university was named a member of the Association of American Universities.

== Campus ==
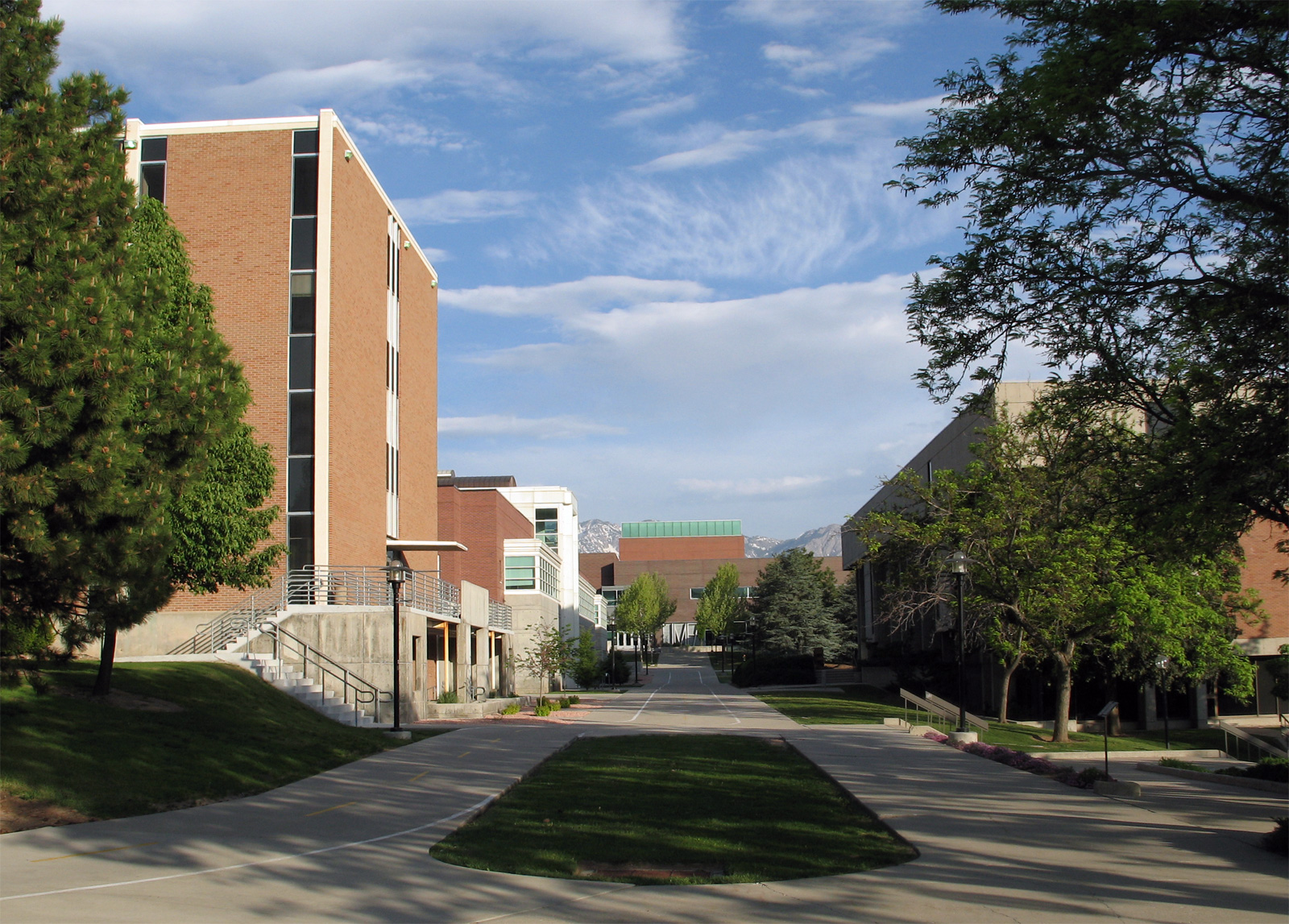
A view of lower campus

The campus covers 1,534 acres (6.21 km^{2}), including the Health Sciences complex, Research Park, and Fort Douglas. It is located on the east bench of the Salt Lake Valley, close to the Wasatch Range and approximately 2 miles east of downtown Salt Lake City.

Most courses take place on the west side of campus, known as lower campus due to its lower elevation. Presidents Circle is a loop of buildings named after past university presidents with a courtyard in the center. Major libraries on lower campus include the J. Willard Marriott Library and the S.J. Quinney Law Library. The primary student activity center is the A. Ray Olpin University Union, and campus fitness centers include the Health, Physical Education, and Recreation Complex (HPER) and the Eccles Student Life Center.

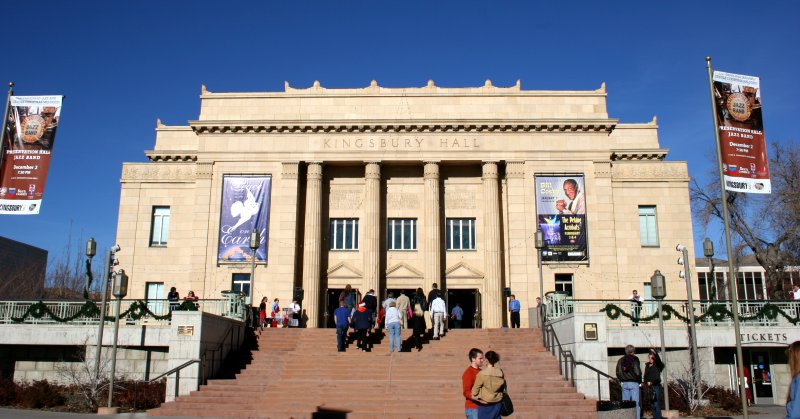
Kingsbury Hall at the Presidents Circle is a center for the performing arts.

Lower campus is also home to most public venues, such as the Rice–Eccles Stadium, the Jon M. Huntsman Center, and the Utah Museum of Fine Arts, a museum with rotating exhibitions and a permanent collection of American, European, African, and Asian art. Venues for performing arts include Kingsbury Hall, used for touring companies and concerts, Pioneer Memorial Theatre, used by the professional Pioneer Theatre Company, David P. Gardner Hall, used by the School of Music and for musical performances, and the Marriott Center for Dance. Red Butte Garden, with formal gardens and natural areas, as well as the new site of the Utah Museum of Natural History, is located on the far east side of campus.

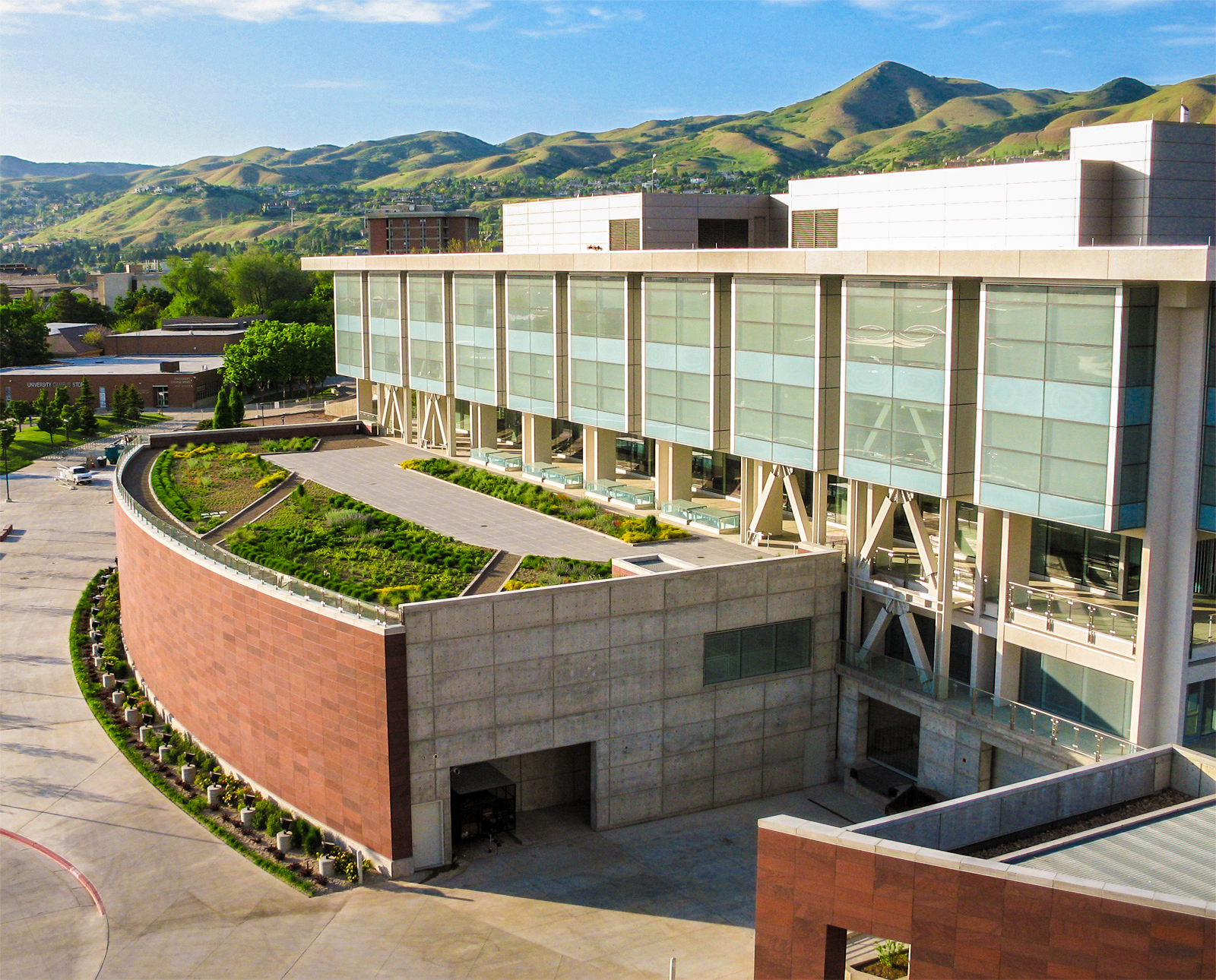
The J. Willard Marriott Library

The health sciences complex, at the northeast end of campus, includes the University of Utah Medical Center, Primary Children's Medical Center, the Huntsman Cancer Institute, the Moran Eye Center, and the Spencer S. Eccles Health Sciences Library. South of the health sciences complex, several university residence halls and apartments are clustered together near Fort Douglas and the Heritage Center, which serves as a student center and cafeteria for this area. In addition, there are 1,115 university apartments for students, staff, and faculty across three apartment complexes on campus. At the southeast end of campus is Research Park, which is home to research companies including ARUP Laboratories, Evans & Sutherland, Sarcos, Biofire Diagnostics, and Myriad Genetics.

Courses are also held at off-campus centers located in St. George and Sandy.

In July 2017, the Academic Senate bestowed the designation of tobacco-free campus on the university, but rules were not enforced until 2018. The rule prohibits students and faculty from "smoking or using chewing tobacco, electronic cigarettes and all other recreational nicotine-delivery products on any property owned, leased or controlled by the University of Utah."

=== Student residences ===
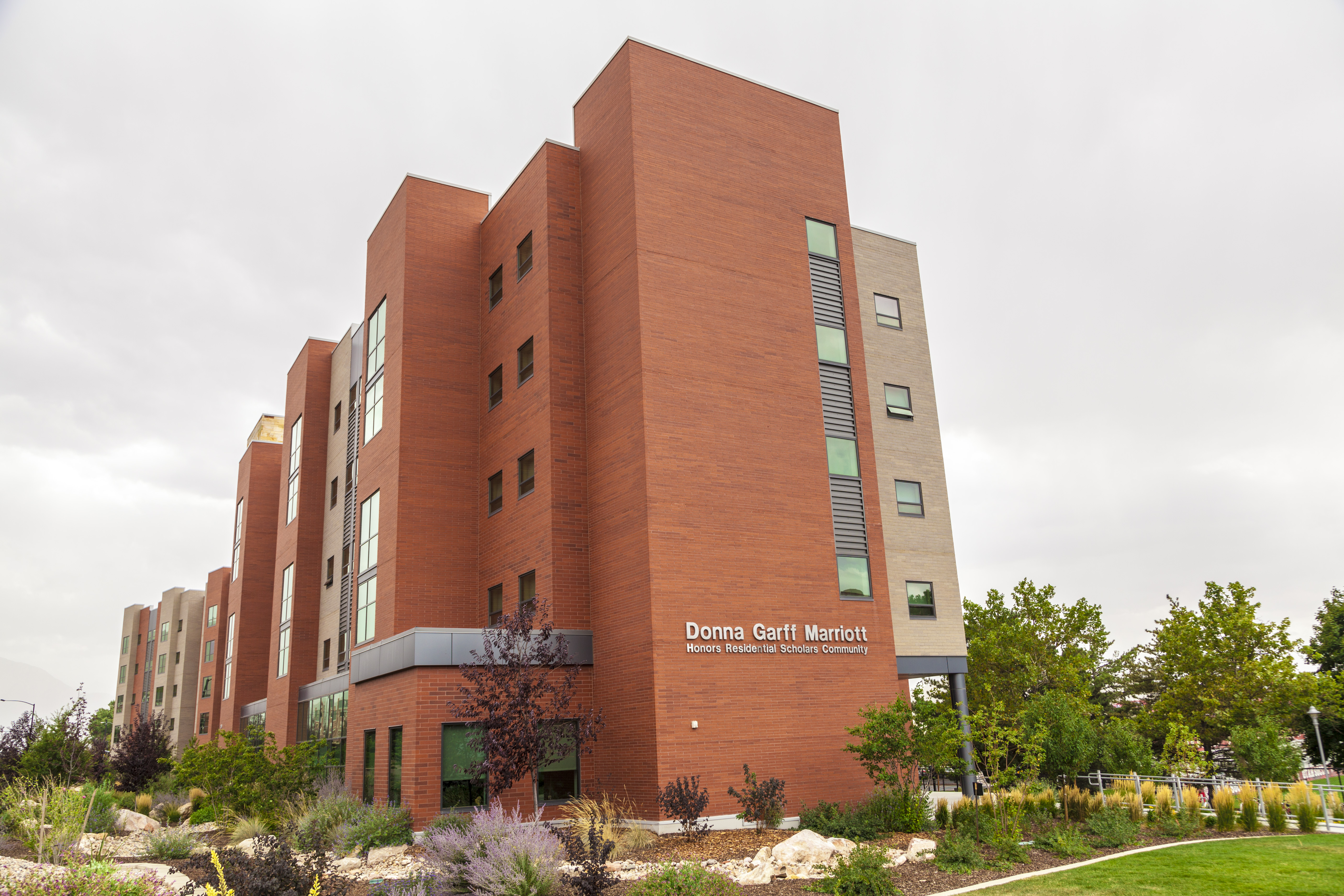
The Donna Garff Marriott Honors Residential Scholars Community

The University of Utah provides student housing in a 34-building housing complex on campus. The complex consists of nine housing areas: Chapel Glen, Gateway Heights, Sage Point, Officer's Circle, Benchmark Plaza, Shoreline Ridge, the Donna Garff Marriott Honors Residential Scholars Community (MHC for short), the Lassonde Studios, and Kahlert Village. The MHC is a dormitory strictly for honors students and was completed in fall 2012. Built in 2016, the Lassonde Studios is part of the Lassonde Entrepreneur Institute and houses 400 students; the studios also feature a "creative garage" with 3D printers and spaces for startups. Kahlert Village, completed in August 2020, houses 990 first-year students.

=== Transportation ===
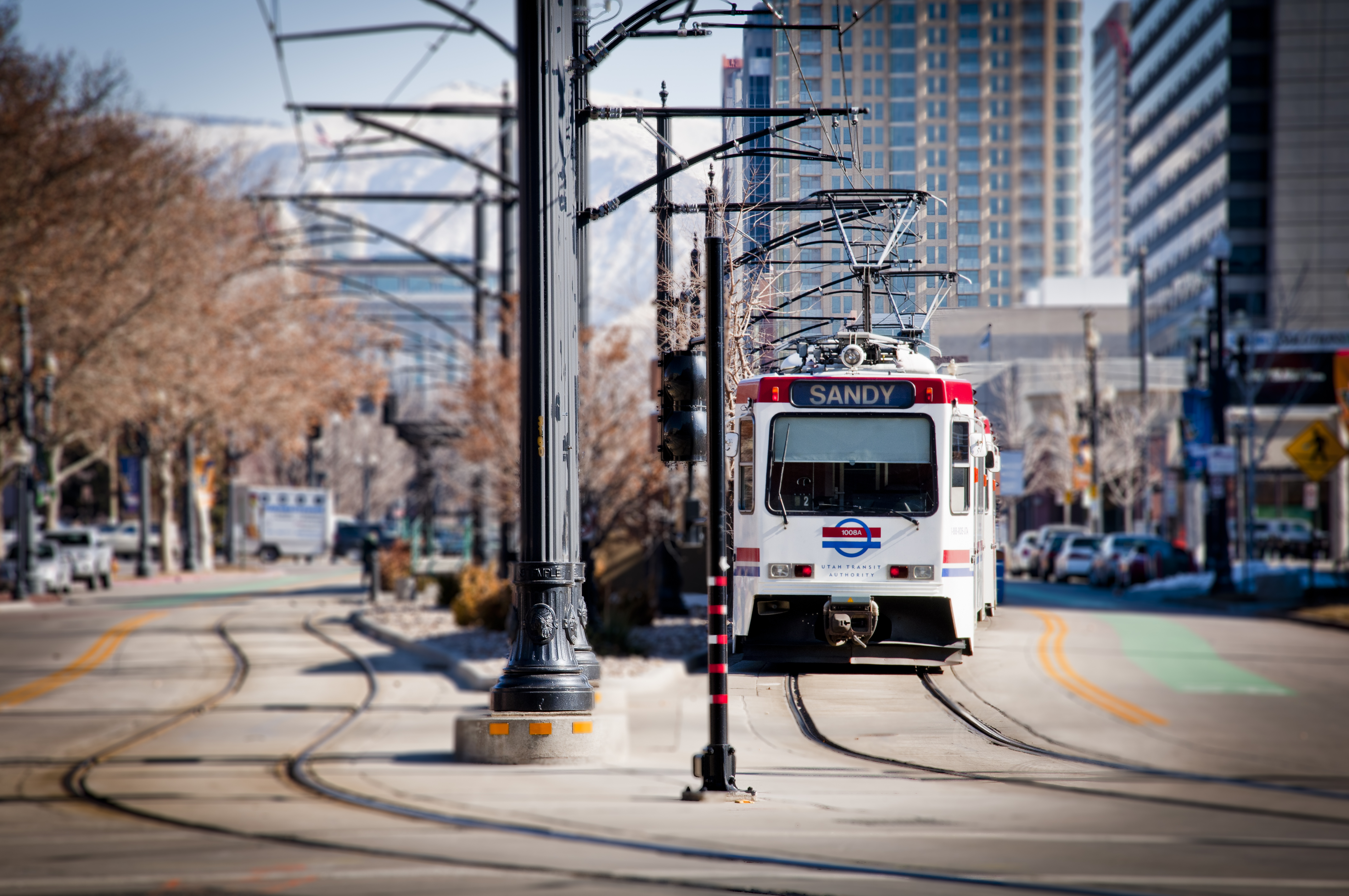
UTA TRAX services the university and other parts of Salt Lake City.

A number of campus shuttles, running on biodiesel and used vegetable oil, circle the campus on six different routes. The Utah Transit Authority (UTA) runs several buses through the university area as well as the TRAX Red Line (light rail), which runs to South Jordan. Riders can travel downtown, to FrontRunner (commuter rail), to West Valley, to the Salt Lake City International Airport, or to Draper by transferring to the TRAX Green or Blue lines. Students and staff can use their university IDs to ride UTA buses, TRAX, and FrontRunner.

In 2012, the university unveiled a new plan for a more conducive campus for bicyclists called the "Bicycle Master Plan" which aims to transform the campus into a safer and more accessible place for cycling and to promote bicycle ridership. The plan emphasizes both campus pathways and on-street facilities that connect the core campus area with surrounding neighborhoods. The Bicycle Master Plan gives guidelines for facilities and programs that are within the University's jurisdiction. It also provides recommendations for the University to work with external entities such as UDOT, UTA, and Salt Lake City to improve bicycling conditions in locations that are important to the campus environment, but which are not under the University's direct control.

=== Sustainability ===
Sustainability efforts include a permanent sustainability office, a campus cogeneration plant, building upgrades and energy efficient building standards, behavior modification programs, purchasing local produce for campus dining, a farmers market, and student groups, as well as a branch of the Salt Lake City Bicycle Collective. Sustainability and transportation are also a large part of the university's campus master plan. The Sustainable Endowments Institute gave the university a "B+" in its College Sustainability Report Card 2011, with A's for climate change and energy, food and recycling, student involvement, and transportation.

The expanded recycling program launched on July 1, 2007. Since its launch, the program has continued to grow and refine its procedures to better accommodate a growing campus' needs. There are programs in place for paper, cardboard, aluminum, batteries, glass, printer cartridges, wooden pallets and plastics #1 and #2.

=== Renewable energy ===
The university is ranked 8th by the EPA for annual green power usage among universities, with 49% of its power coming from geothermal and solar sources.

The university houses 10 solar array systems, including a 330-kilowatt system on the rooftop of the Natural History Museum of Utah and a 262-kilowatt system at the HPER East building. The combined arrays annually produce 1,096,340 kilowatt hours, and are supported by a student fee sustainability program established in 2008.

On November 1, 2019, the university entered into a renewable energy partnership with Rocky Mountain Power and Cyrq Energy which allows the purchase of 20 megawatts of geothermal energy for 25 years. The contract offsets half of the electricity produced by the university and reduces the university's carbon emissions by 23%.

== Organization ==
The University of Utah is governed by a 10-member Board of Trustees, 8 of whom are appointed by the Governor of Utah with the consent of the Utah Senate. The President of the University of Utah Alumni Association serves as the 9th member, and the President of the Associated Students of the University of Utah (ASUU) serves as the 10th member. The 8 appointed members serve for four-year terms, four expiring on June 30 of each odd-numbered year. The two ex officio members serve for the terms of their respective offices.

The University of Utah and the other public colleges and universities of the Utah System of Higher Education are governed by the Utah Board of Higher Education (previously the Utah State Board of Regents) whose chief executive officer is the Commissioner of Higher Education.

The chief executive officer of the University of Utah is the president, who reports to the Board of Higher Education and, with the approval of the trustees, submits budgets, tuition adjustments, and academic program plans, appoints faculty, and develops policy initiatives.

Subject to the board of trustees, the university faculty have authority to legislate on matters of educational policy via the Academic Senate. The senate is composed of 100 faculty members proportionally representing and elected by their respective colleges, two elected deans, and 18 students from the ASUU, one from each college and the ASUU president. The senate also includes the university president, Senior Vice President for Academic Affairs, Senior Vice President for Health Sciences, and all non-elected deans as ex officio members who may debate and present motions but do not vote. Much of the actual senate work is carried out by 12 senate-elected committees which work on the central academic issues of the institution. The committees report to the full senate, and the senate often acts on their proposals as well as on issues brought to its attention by the administration.

== Academics and rankings ==
Academic rankings

National
- Forbes: 99
- U.S. News & World Report: 151 (tie)
- Washington Monthly: 241
- WSJ/College Pulse: 78

Global
- ARWU: 151-200
- QS: 540 (tie)
- THE: 201–250
- U.S. News & World Report: 141 (tie)

The University of Utah is accredited through the Northwest Commission on Colleges and Universities since 1933. The university organizes its 150 academic departments and programs into 17 colleges and schools. The School for Cultural and Social Transformation is the university's newest college, with its first graduating class in 2018.

- College of Architecture and Planning
- David Eccles School of Business
- School for Cultural and Social Transformation
- School of Dentistry
- College of Education
- John and Marcia Price College of Engineering
- College of Fine Arts
- College of Health
- University of Utah Honors College
- College of Humanities
- S.J. Quinney College of Law
- College of Mines and Earth Sciences
- College of Nursing
- College of Pharmacy
- College of Science
- College of Social and Behavioral Science
- College of Social Work

The university operates on a semester calendar with the rest of the Utah higher education system. Undergraduate tuition and fees for 2015–2016 were $8,240 for Utah residents (about 325% the cost of tuition and fees in 2000, $2,534 for 13 credit hours per semester, 2 semesters), and $26,180 for non-residents per 12-credit-hour semester.

=== Admissions and demographics ===
Undergraduate demographics as of Fall 2023
Race and ethnicity	Total
White	63%
Hispanic	14%
Asian	6%
International student	6%
Two or more races	6%
Unknown	3%
Black	1%
Economic diversity
Low-income (Note: The percentage of students who received an income-based federal Pell grant intended for low-income students.)	22%
Affluent (Note: The percentage of students who are a part of the American middle class at the bare minimum.)	78%

For the Class of 2023 (enrolling fall 2019), Utah received 24,404 applications and accepted 15,159 (62%), with 4,249 enrolling. The middle 50% range of SAT scores for enrolling freshmen was 572.5-680 for evidence-based reading and writing, 570–700 for math, and 1150–1370 for the composite. The middle 50% ACT score range was 22–28 for math, 21–31 for English, and 22–29 for the composite. The average high school grade point average (GPA) was 3.66.

The university uses a holistic admissions process and weighs ACT/SAT standardized test scores, GPA, grade trend, rigorous AP/IB/Honors classes taken in high school, academic achievements, along with other "personal achievements and characteristics".

=== Notable programs ===
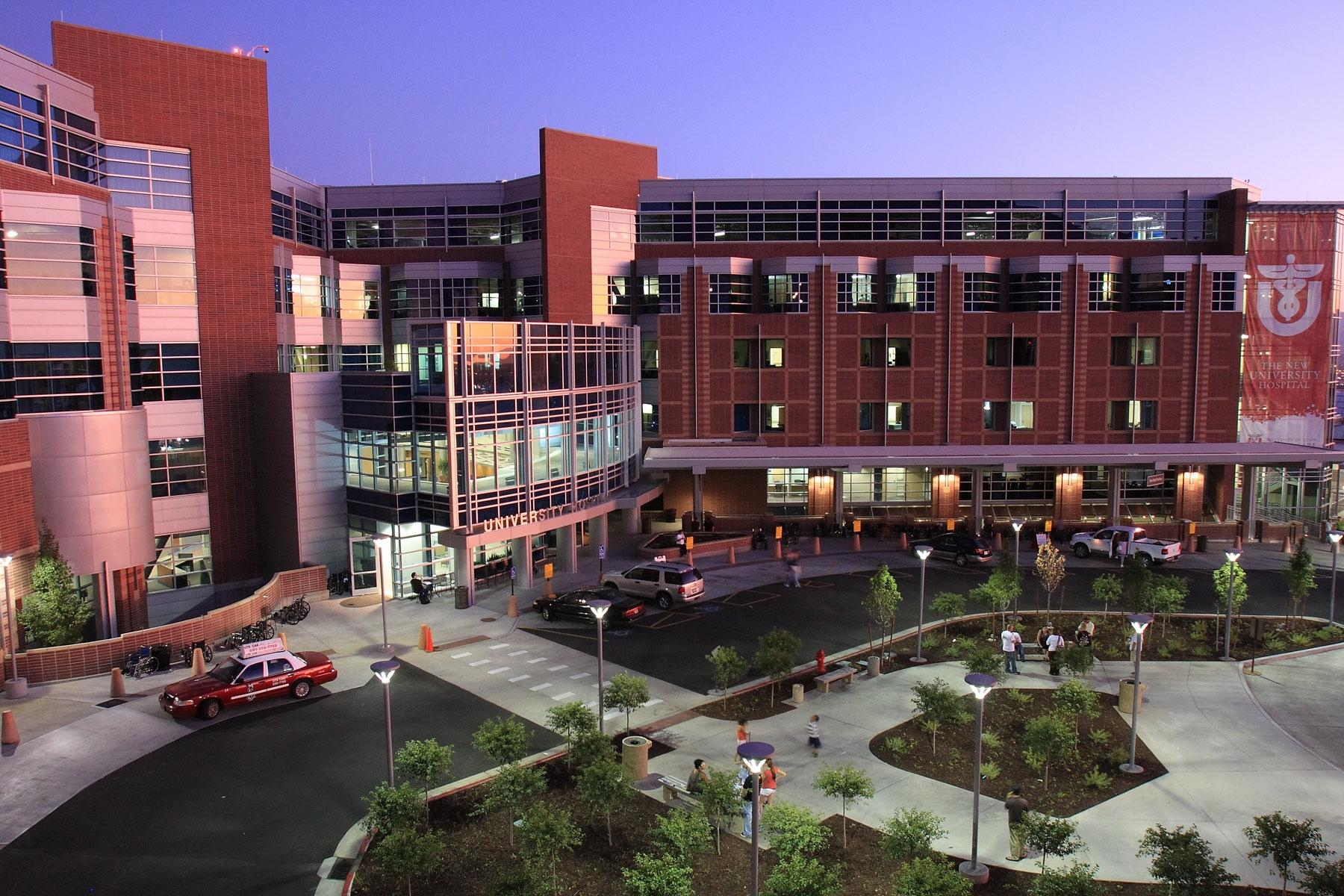
The University of Utah Medical Center

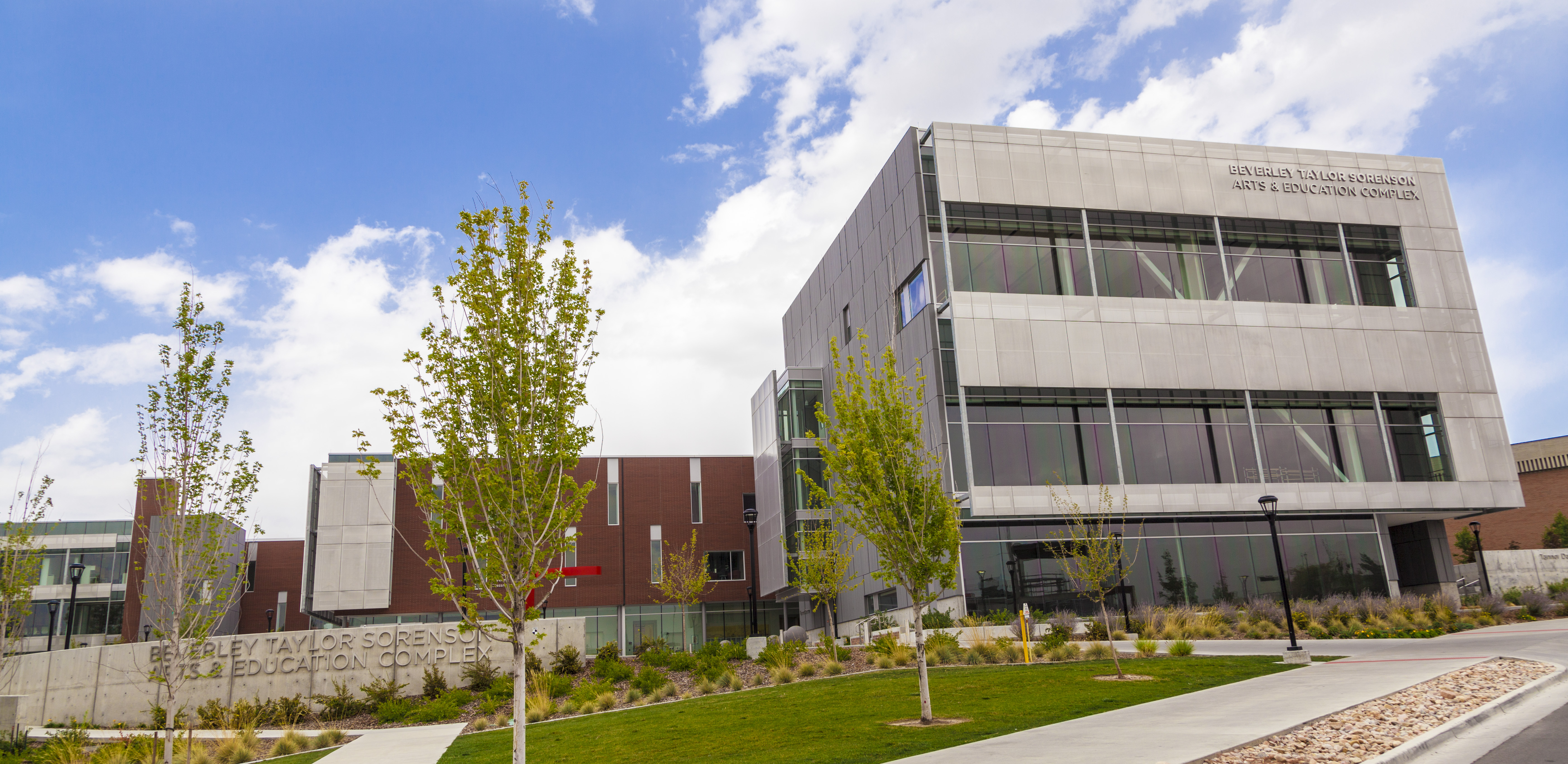
The Sorensen Arts & Education Complex

==== Ballet ====
The Department of Ballet offers the top ranked ballet and ballroom dance program in the United States and is one of the oldest and most reputable university ballet departments in the country. The department was founded by William F. Christensen in 1951, who also founded the San Francisco Ballet and Ballet West companies.

==== Biology ====
The university has made unique contributions to the study of genetics due in part to long-term genealogy efforts of the LDS Church, which has allowed researchers to trace genetic disorders through several generations. The relative homogeneity of Utah's population also makes it an ideal laboratory for studies of population genetics. The university is home to the Genetic Science Learning Center, a resource which educates the public about genetics through its website.

==== Computer Science ====
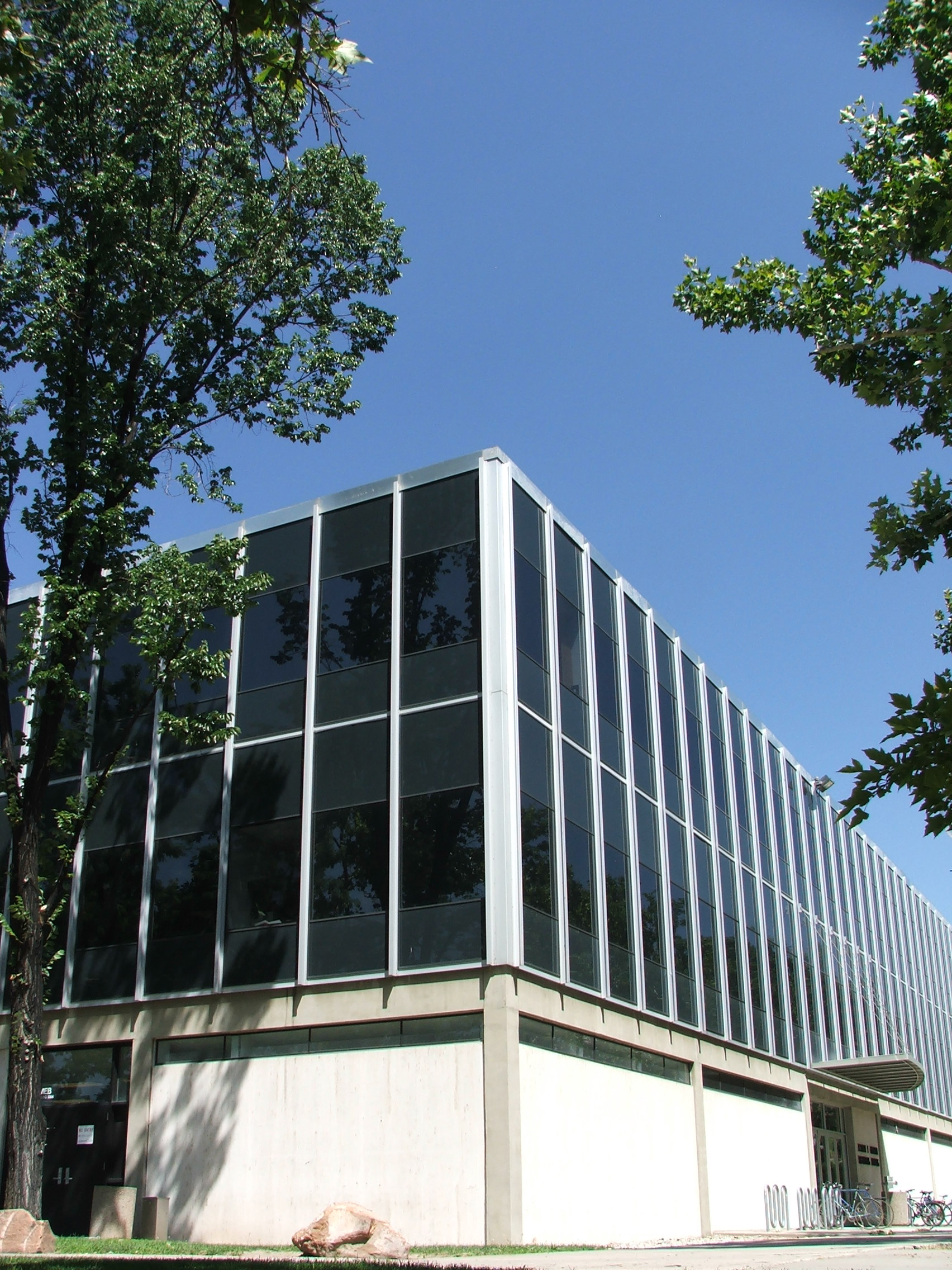
Merrill Engineering Building

The University of Utah was one of the original four nodes of ARPANET, the world's first packet-switched network and embryo of the current worldwide Internet. The School of Computing produced many of the early pioneers in computer science and graphics, including Turing Award winner Alan Kay, Pixar founder Ed Catmull, Atari founder Nolan Bushnell, and Adobe founder John Warnock. Notable innovations of computer science faculty and alumni include the first method for representing surface textures in graphical images, the Gouraud shading model, magnetic ink printing technology, the Johnson counter logic circuit, the oldest algebraic mathematics package still in use (REDUCE), the Phong reflection model, the Phong shading method, and the rendering equation. Through the movement of Utah graduates and faculty, research at the University spread outward to laboratories like Xerox Parc, JPL, and the New York Institute of Technology. Present graphics research is focused on biomedical applications for visualization, scientific computing, and image analysis at the Scientific Computing and Imaging Institute.

==== Dentistry ====
In March 2012, the university received unanimous approval from the board of trustees to create a new academic college, the School of Dentistry, which is the university's first new college in sixty years. The new school has received funding for a new structure and has started as a debt-free program. The new school enrolled its first students for the fall semester of 2013 and averages the same cost as the university's medical school tuition.

==== Games ====
In July of 2023 the university created the Division of Games as an academic department. Prior to this, it had a teaching program that initially supported an emphasis in Entertainment Arts & Engineering (EAE) for students majoring in Film or Computer Science, later a Masters Degree in EAE (2010) followed by a BS in Games in 2017. The program has grown quickly over the years and has also consistently been ranked highly. In 2024, The Princeton Review ranked it first among public universities and its graduate program second, Animation Career Review ranked it fourth in 2025, and in 2026 the US News rankings listed it in the number two position for "Best Undergraduate Game Design Programs". The game program has also been cited as "one of the key drivers behind the growth" and success of the videogame industry in Utah.

==== Law ====
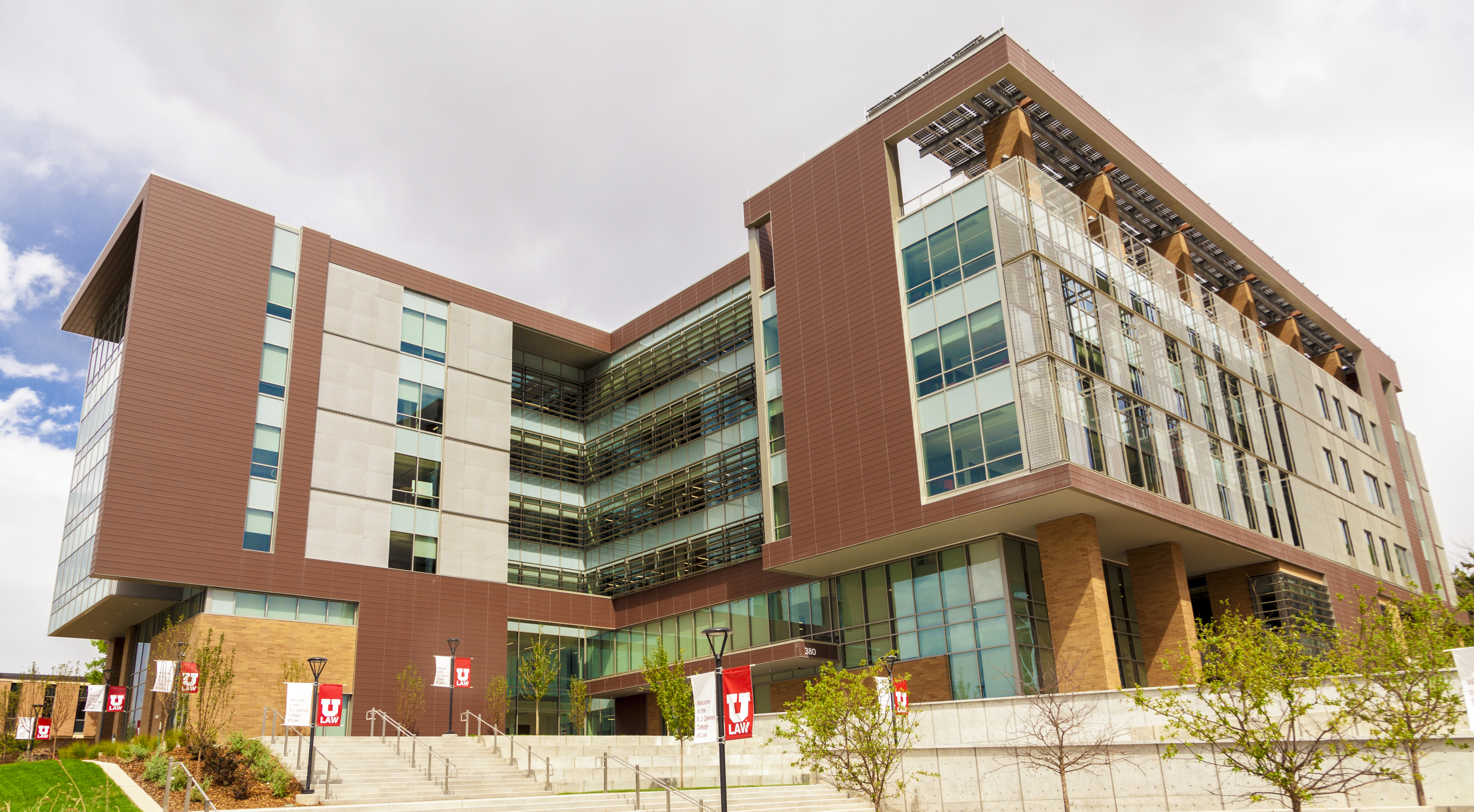
The S.J. Quinney College of Law

The S.J. Quinney College of Law, founded in 1913, was the only law school in Utah until the 1970s. The law school was ranked the #28 best law school in the country in the 2024 U.S. News "Best Law Schools" rankings.

==== Medicine ====
The University of Utah (University of Utah Hospital) has the only accredited allopathic medical school in the State of Utah. The medical school has made several notable contributions to medicine, such as establishing the first Cerebrovascular Disease Unit west of the Mississippi River in 1970 and administering the world's first permanent artificial heart, the Jarvik-7, to Barney Clark in 1982.

==== Pharmacy ====
The University of Utah College of Pharmacy is ranked 15th in the nation for NIH research grants as of 2023, and its PharmD program is ranked 14th in the nation. The department of Pharmacology and Toxicology within the School of Pharmacy is world-renowned for research in epilepsy treatment with their Anticonvulsant Drug Development (ADD) program.

==== Political Science ====
The university is host to the Neal A. Maxwell Lecture Series in Political Theory and Contemporary Politics, a forum for political theorists to share their newest theoretical work, and is home to the Hinckley Institute of Politics, which places more than 350 students every year in local, state, national, and global internships.

==== Turkish Studies Program and Armenian genocide denial ====
The university's Turkish Studies Program, funded by Turkish Coalition of America and headed by M. Hakan Yavuz, has been criticized for promoting Armenian genocide denial. Nevertheless, the university had established itself as a "denialist beachhead" prior to the creation of the Turkish Studies Program. The University of Utah Press has published several books denying the Armenian genocide, beginning with Guenter Lewy's The Armenian Massacres in Ottoman Turkey. The book's publication by the University of Utah Press was arranged by Yavuz himself.

Professor Keith David Watenpaugh charges the program with "promoting the falsification of history through its grants and political advocacy... the University of Utah has provided an institutional home to genocide denial." In 2020, regarding "a student complaint and messages of concern from the Armenian community about the content of an article written by and assigned in a class taught by Hakan Yavuz," the university made a statement, according to which: "The United States, the state of Utah and the University of Utah (as a state entity), recognize the historical events of 1915 as the Armenian genocide".

== Athletics ==
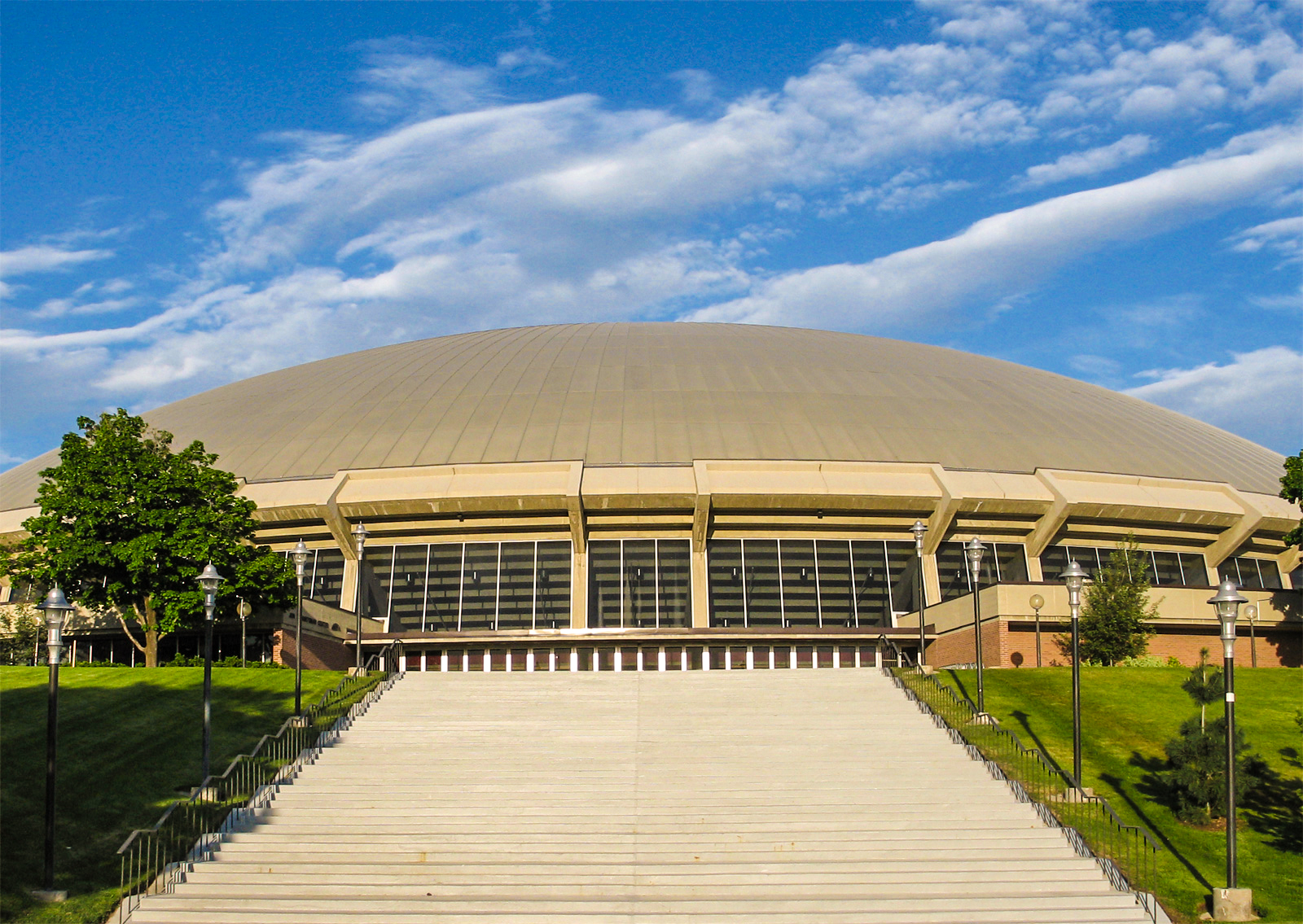
Jon M. Huntsman Center serves as a basketball and gymnastics venue.

The university has nine men's and 11 women's varsity teams. Athletic teams include men's baseball, basketball, football, golf, hockey, lacrosse, skiing, swimming/diving, and tennis and women's basketball, cross country, gymnastics, skiing, soccer, softball, swimming/diving, tennis, track and field, and volleyball. The school's sports teams are called the Utes, though some teams have an additional nickname, such as "Runnin' Utes" for the men's basketball team. The university participates in the NCAA's Division I (FBS for football) as part of the Big 12 Conference. There is a fierce BYU–Utah rivalry, and the Utah–BYU football game, traditionally the season finale, has been called the "Holy War" by national broadcasting commentators. The university fight song is "Utah Man", commonly played at athletic games and other university events. In 1996, Swoop was introduced as the new mascot of the University of Utah. Because of relationships with the local Ute Indians, Utah adopted a new mascot. While still known as the Utes, Utah is now represented by the red-tailed hawk known for the use of his tail feathers in Ute headdresses, and which is said to reflect "the soaring spirit of our state and school".

In 2002, the university was one of 20 schools to make the U.S. News & World Report College Sports Honor Roll. In 2005, Utah became the first school to produce No. 1 overall draft picks in both the NFL draft and NBA draft for the same year. Alex Smith was picked first overall by the San Francisco 49ers in the 2005 NFL draft, and Andrew Bogut was picked first overall by the Milwaukee Bucks in the 2005 NBA draft. The university has won fifteen NCAA Skiing Championships, most recently in 2023, as well as the 1977 AIAW National Women's Skiing Championship.

=== Men's basketball ===
The men's basketball team won the NCAA title in 1944 and the NIT crown in 1947. Arnie Ferrin, the only four-time All-American in Utah basketball history, played for both the 1944 and 1947 teams. He also went on to help the Minneapolis Lakers win NBA Championships in 1949 and 1951. Wat Misaka, the first person of Asian descent to play in the NBA, also played for Utah during this era.

Utah basketball rose again to national prominence when head coach Rick Majerus took his team, including guard Andre Miller, combo forward Hanno Möttölä, and post player Michael Doleac, to the NCAA Final Four in 1998. After eliminating North Carolina to advance to the final round, Utah lost the championship game to Kentucky, 78–69.

=== Football ===
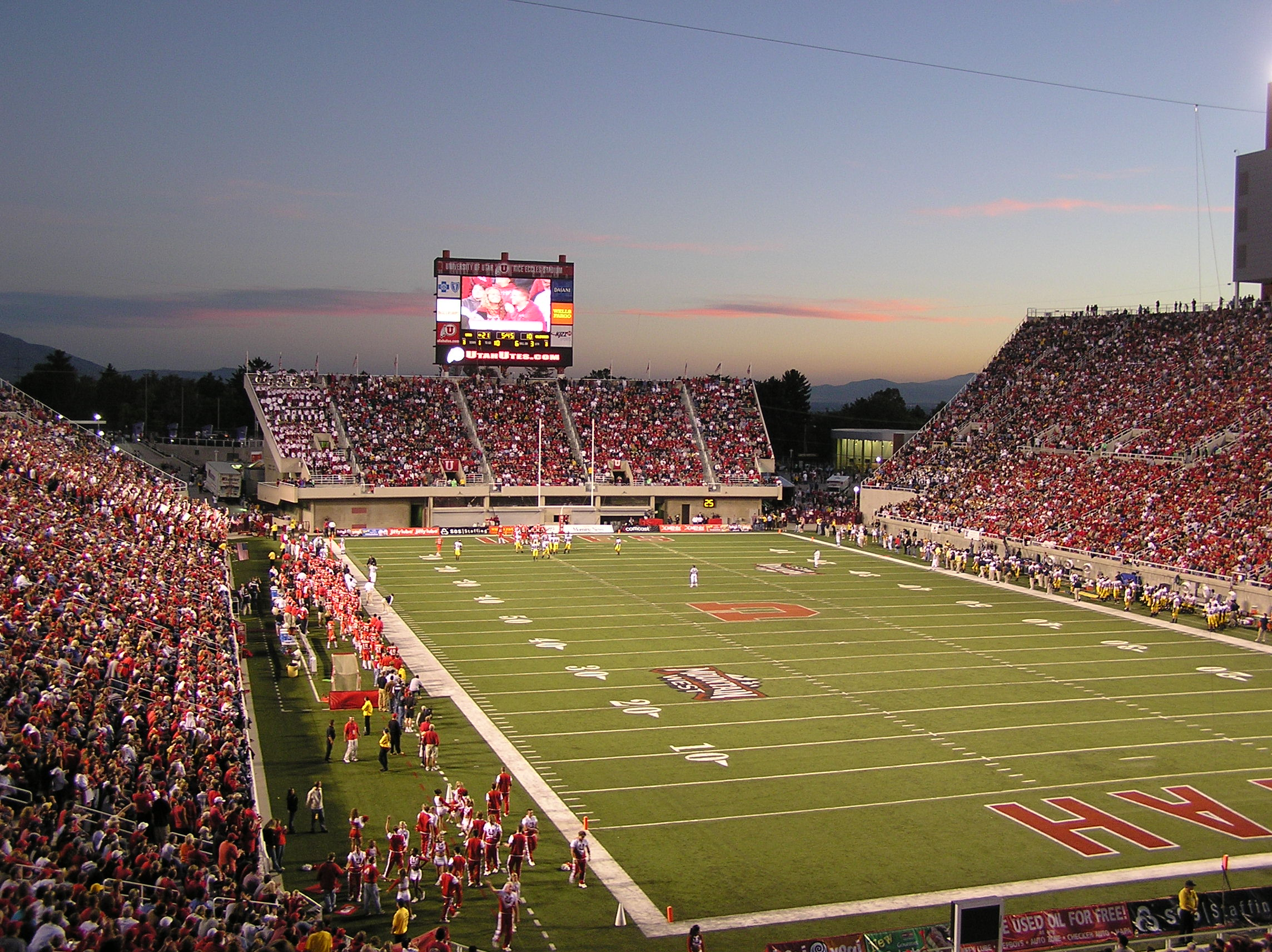
Rice–Eccles Stadium during a football game

In 2004–2005, the football team, coached by Urban Meyer and quarterbacked by Alex Smith, along with defensive great Eric Weddle, went 11–0 during the regular season and defeated Pittsburgh 35–7 in the 2005 Fiesta Bowl, becoming the first team from a conference without an automatic Bowl Championship Series (BCS) bid to go to a BCS bowl game. The team ended its perfect 12–0 season ranked 4th in AP polling.

2008–2009 was another undefeated year for the football team, coached by Kyle Whittingham, as they finished the season 13–0 and defeated Alabama 31–17 in the 2009 Sugar Bowl. Utah finished the season 2nd in AP polling, their highest rank ever. At the end of the season, the Utes were the only unbeaten team in the country, with the nation's longest active streak of bowl victories (8).

The Utah Utes moved to the Pac-12 Conference for the start of the 2011–2012 football season. They were in the South Division with University of Colorado, University of Arizona, Arizona State University, UCLA and University of Southern California. Their first game in the Pac-12 was at USC on September 10, 2011, and resulted in a 23–14 Utah loss.

=== Gymnastics ===
The women's gymnastics team, coached by Carly Dockendorf, has won ten national championships, including the 1981 AIAW championship, and placed 2nd nationally eight times. As of 2013, it has qualified for the NCAA championship every year since 1976, the only program to do so. The program has averaged over 11,000 fans per meet 1992–2010 and has been the NCAA gymnastics season attendance champions 16 of these 19 years. In 2010, there was an average of 14,213 fans per meet, the largest crowd being 15,030.

=== Marching band ===
The university marching band, known as the "Pride of Utah", perform at all home football games, as well as some away games and bowl games. They performed at the 2005 Fiesta Bowl, the 2009 Sugar Bowl, and the Inaugural Parade of President Barack Obama.

The band began as a military band in the 1940s. In 1948, university president A. Ray Olpin recruited Ron Gregory from Ohio State University to form a collegiate marching band. Support for the band dwindled in the 60s, and ASUU (the Associated Students of the University of Utah) discontinued its funding in 1969. The band was revived in 1976 after a fund raising effort under the direction of Gregg I. Hanson. As of 2011, the band was under the direction of Dr. Brian Sproul.

== Student life ==
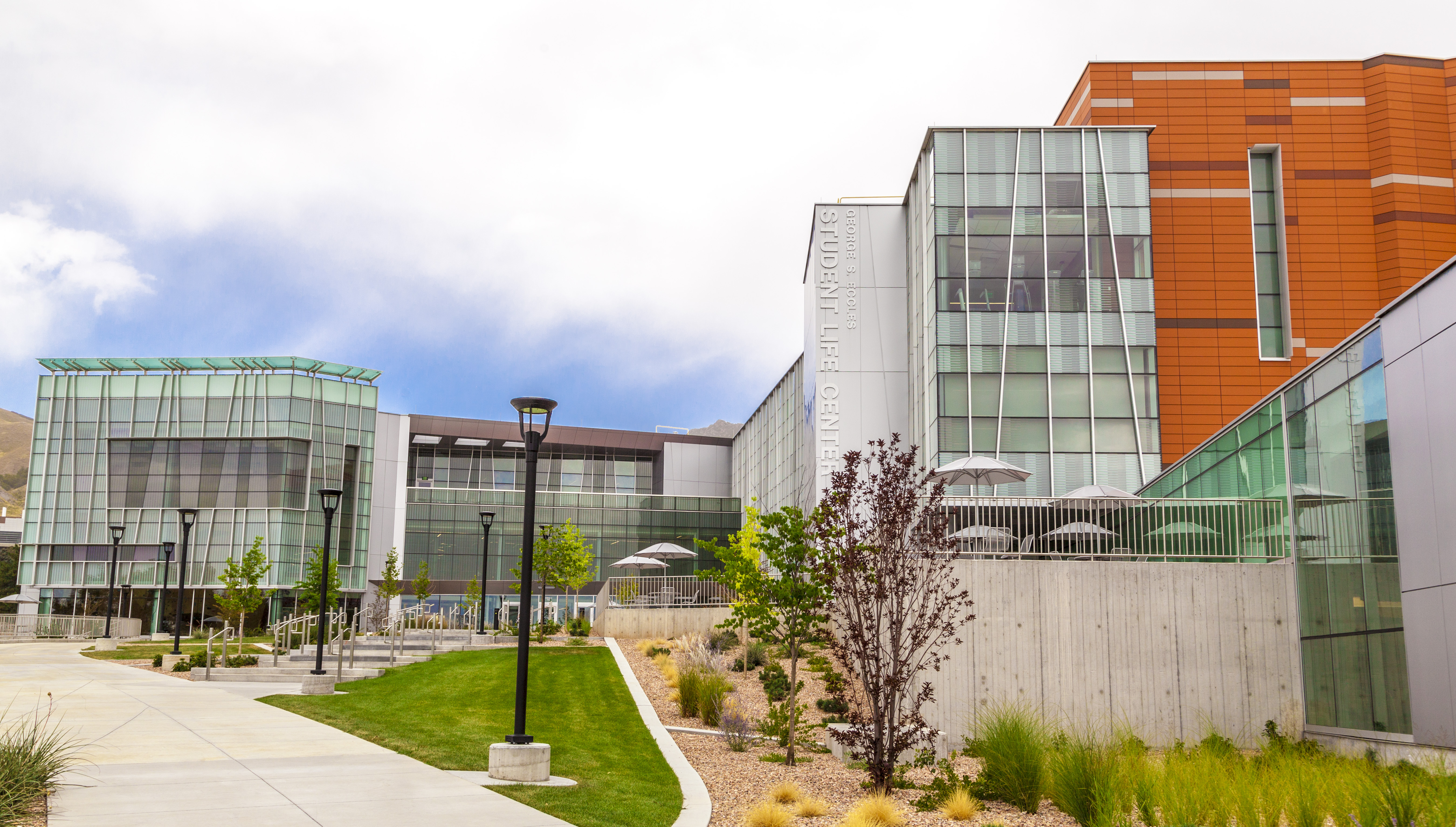
Student Life Center

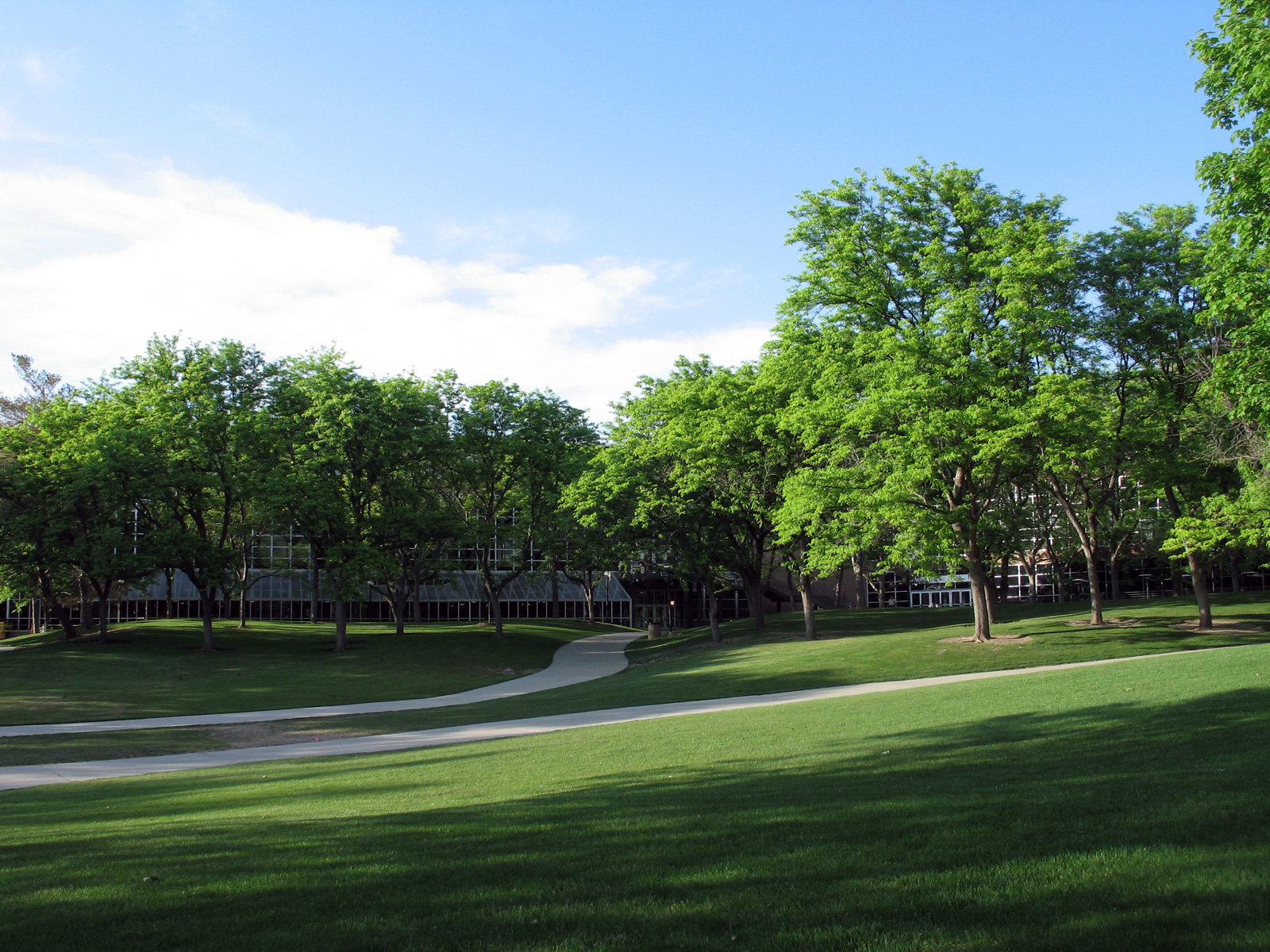
A. Ray Olpin University Union and courtyard

Close to 50% of freshmen live on campus, but most students choose to live elsewhere after their first year, with 13% of all undergraduates living on campus. The university is located in a large metropolitan area. Many students live in the neighborhoods immediately surrounding the university. An additional 1,115 family apartments are available to students, staff, and faculty. One of the university's primary four goals for long-term campus growth is to increase student engagement through the addition of on-campus housing, intramural fields, athletic centers, and a new student activity center.

The current student activity center, the A. Ray Olpin University Union, is a common gathering place for university-wide events such as Crimson Nights, roughly monthly student activity nights; PlazaFest, a fair for campus groups at the start of the school year; and the Grand Kerfuffle, a concert at the end of the school year. The building includes a cafeteria, computer lab, recreational facilities, and a ballroom for special events. The Union also houses the Lowell Bennion Community Service Center, CESA (Center for Ethnic Student Affairs) which provides an inclusive space for students and houses various advising programs of the Office of Equity and Diversity, the Union Programming Council which is in charge of promoting student life on campus through events like Crimson Nights, and ASUU (the Associated Students of the University of Utah), which is responsible for appropriating funds to student groups and organizations on campus. ASUU holds primary and general elections each year for student representatives, typically with 10–15% of the student population voting.

Because a substantial amount of students are members of the LDS Church, there is an LDS Institute of Religion building near main campus, as well as several LDS student groups and 46 campus wards. Approximately 650 students are part of 6 sororities and 8 fraternities at the university, most of which have chapter houses on "Greek Row" just off campus.

The University of Utah has a dry campus, meaning that alcohol is banned on campus. In 2004, Utah became the first state with a law expressly permitting concealed weapons on public university campuses. The University of Utah tried to uphold its gun ban but the Utah Supreme Court rejected the ban in 2006.

== Media ==
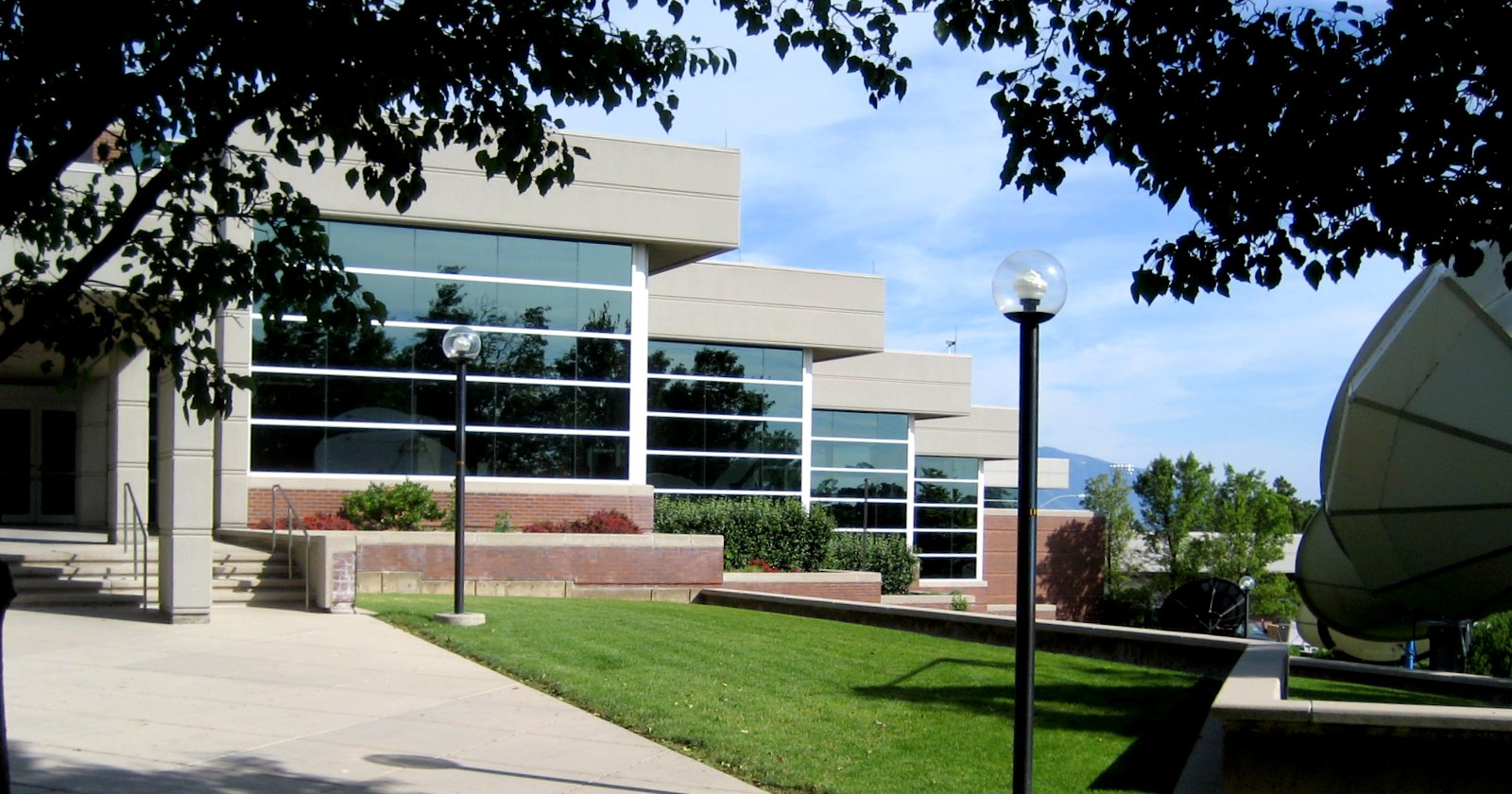
Eccles Broadcast Center is home to three broadcast stations.

The university has several public broadcasting affiliations, many of which utilize the Eccles Broadcast Center. These stations include PBS Utah (formerly branded as KUED channel 7), a PBS member station and producer of local documentaries; KUEN channel 9, an educational station for teachers and students from the Utah Education Network; KUER 90.1 FM, a public radio affiliate of National Public Radio, American Public Media, and Public Radio International; and K-UTE 1620.

NewsBreak is the student-run television newscast on campus. During 2011, the program celebrated its 40th anniversary. Broadcasts air every Thursday night at 10 pm during the fall and spring semesters on KUEN.

The Daily Utah Chronicle, also referred to as the Chrony, has been the university's independent, student-run paper since 1890. It publishes daily on school days during fall and spring semesters and weekly during summer semester. The paper typically runs between eight and twelve pages, with longer editions for weekend game guides. The paper converted to a broadsheet format in 2003 when the Newspaper Agency Corporation began printing it. The Society of Professional Journalists selected the newspaper as one of three finalists for best all-around daily student newspaper in the nation in both 2007 and 2008. Staff from the Chronicle feed into Utah journalism circles, some of them rising to considerable prominence, such as former editor Matt Canham, whose work with The Salt Lake Tribune earned him the Don Baker Investigative Reporting Award from the Utah Chapter of the Society of Professional Journalists.

The University of Utah Press, the oldest press in Utah and now part of the J. Willard Marriott Library, publishes books on topics including the outdoors, anthropology and archaeology, linguistics, creative nonfiction, Mesoamerica, Native American studies, and Utah, Mormon, and Western history. The Wallace Stegner Prize in American Environmental or Western History is presented annually by the press. Its Utah Series in Middle East Studies has been criticized for "specializing" in "methodologically flawed accounts" of the Armenian genocide that seek to reject the term genocide as being applicable to the event, and includes works by Guenter Lewy, Justin McCarthy, and Yücel Güçlü. The university is also home to two long-running publications: the Western Humanities Review (1947–), and literary journal Quarterly West (1976–).

== Notable alumni and faculty ==
Notable alumni include politicians Rocky Anderson, Bob Bennett, Marsha K. Caddle, Merrill Cook, E. Jake Garn, Jon Huntsman, Jr., Karen Morgan, Frank E. Moss, Joshua Rush, and Karl Rove; recent LDS Church presidents Gordon B. Hinckley, Thomas S. Monson, and Russell M. Nelson; historian and Pulitzer Prize for History laureate Laurel Thatcher Ulrich; journalist and 2017 Pulitzer Prize winner for local reporting Rachel Piper authors Orson Scott Card, Stephen Covey, Marc J. Gregson, Shannon Hale, Terry Tempest Williams, and Wallace Stegner; R Adams Cowley, William DeVries, and Robert Jarvik in medicine; historian Richard Foltz; educators Gordon Gee, Jonathan Westover, and Ann Weaver Hart; reporter Martha Raddatz; writer and canoeist Neal Moore, and speed reading innovator Evelyn Nielsen Wood.

Notable science and engineering alumni include Jim Blinn; Mark W. Fuller, CEO of WET Design; Andrea Russell, Vice President of the International Society of Electrochemistry; Jim Clark, founder of Silicon Graphics, Netscape Communications Corporation, myCFO, and Healtheon; Gretchen W. McClain, former NASA Deputy Associate Administrator of Human Space Exploration and Chief Director of the International Space Station; Henri Gouraud; John C. Cook who played a crucial role in establishing the field of ground-penetrating radar; Ralph Hartley; rocket scientist Joseph Majdalani; Alan Kay; Simon Ramo; and John Warnock, co-founder of Adobe Systems.

Notable entrepreneur and business leader alumni include Alan Ashton, co-founder of WordPerfect and Thanksgiving Point; Freestyle Skiër Tom Wallisch; Nolan Bushnell, founder of Atari and Chuck E. Cheese; Ed Catmull, co-founder of Pixar; J. Willard Marriott, founder of Marriott International; Robert A. "Bob" McDonald, CEO of Procter & Gamble; David Neeleman, founder of JetBlue; Telle Whitney, CEO and President of the Anita Borg Institute; and Nintendo of America's former president, Doug Bowser

In athletics, notable alumni include baseball player Chris Shelton; basketball players Andrew Bogut, Kyle Kuzma, Andre Miller, and Keith Van Horn; football players Paul Kruger, Star Lotulelei, Jamal Anderson, Kevin Dyson, Eric Weddle, Alex Smith, and Steve Smith Sr.; hall of fame karate grandmaster Dan Hausel; and football coach LaVell Edwards. Notable members of the athletics faculty include Sharrieff Shah, coach of the University of Utah football team and husband to Jen Shah, cast member of the Real Housewives of Salt Lake City. Mykayla Skinner was a 2020 Olympic gymnast and vault silver medalist.

Notable alumni also includes serial killer Ted Bundy, who briefly attended the College of Law before dropping out.

Notable faculty in science and engineering include David Evans and Ivan Sutherland, founders of Evans and Sutherland; Bui Tuong Phong, pioneer of computer graphics; Henry Eyring, known for studying chemical reaction rates; Scott A. Summers, founder of Centaurus Therapeutics; Stephen Jacobsen, founder of Sarcos; Jindřich Kopeček and Sung Wan Kim, pioneers of polymeric drug delivery and gene delivery; Suhas Patil, founder of Cirrus Logic; Stanley Pons, who claimed to have discovered "cold fusion" in 1989; Venkatraman Ramakrishnan, later co-winner of the 2009 Nobel Prize in Chemistry; Thomas Stockham, founder of Soundstream; and David W. Grainger, Chair of the Department of Biomedical Engineering, winner of the "Excellence in Pharmaceutics" Award, and alumnus. In medicine, notable faculty include Mario Capecchi, the co-winner of the 2007 Nobel Prize in Physiology or Medicine; Willem Johan Kolff; and Russell M. Nelson. Biologist Ralph Vary Chamberlin, founding dean of the Medical School, professor, and later historian of the University, was also an alumnus.

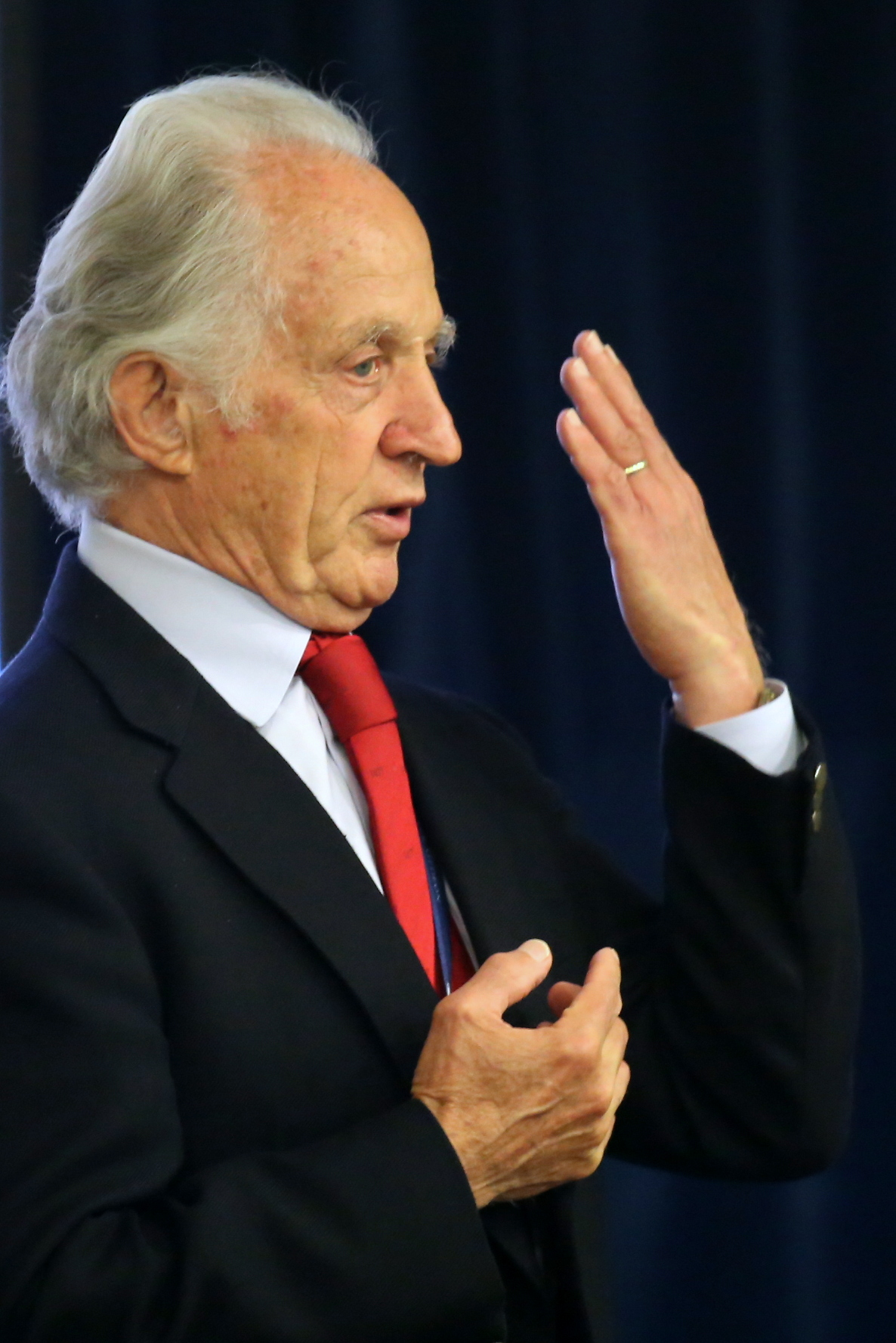
Mario Capecchi, Distinguished Professor of Human Genetics and Biology, co-winner of the 2007 Nobel Prize in Physiology or Medicine

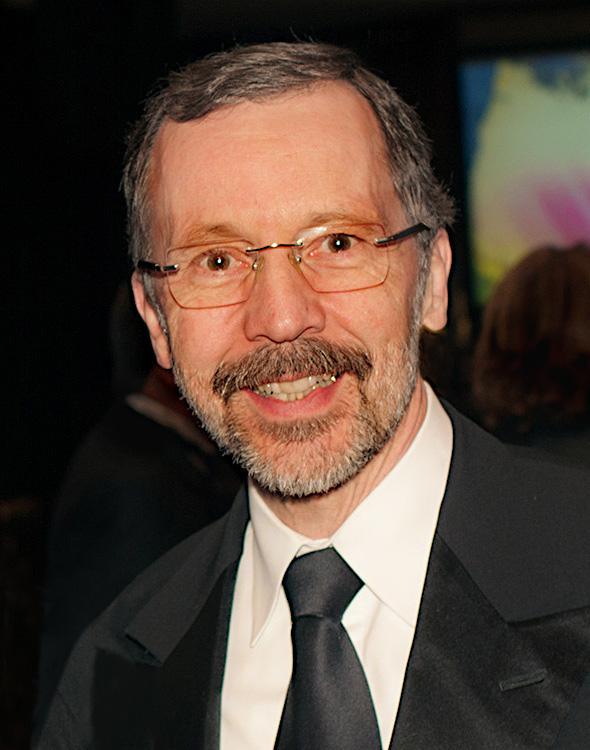
Ed Catmull, B.S. 1969, Ph.D. 1974, co-founder of Pixar, president of Walt Disney Animation Studios and Pixar Animation Studios

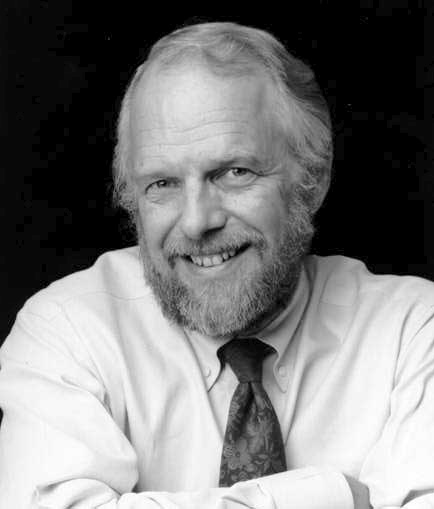
John Warnock, B.S. 1961, M.S. 1964, Ph.D. 1969, co-founder of Adobe Systems Inc.

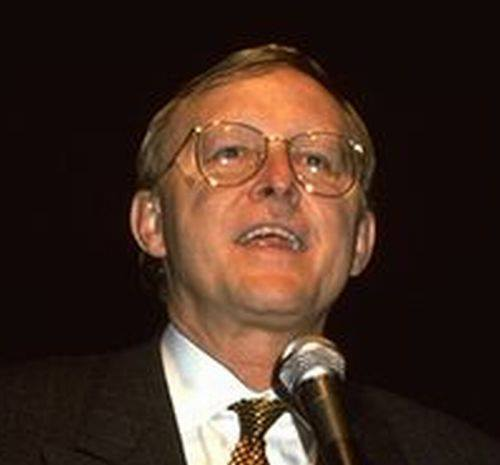
James H. Clark, Ph.D. 1974, founder of Netscape, Silicon Graphics, myCFO, Healtheon, co-author of the Catmull-Clark algorithm

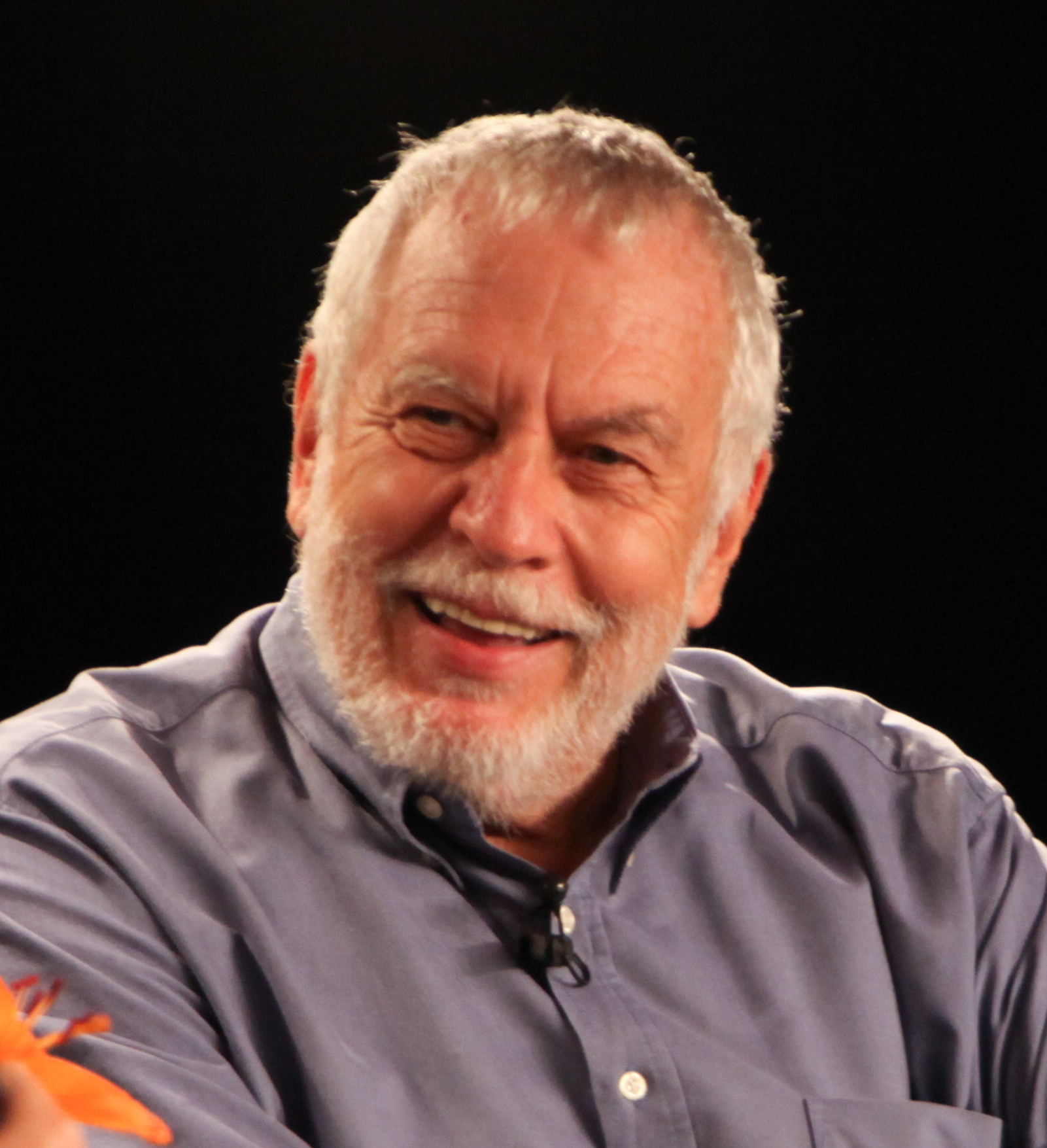
Nolan Bushnell, B.S. 1968, founder of Chuck E. Cheese's, co-founder of Atari

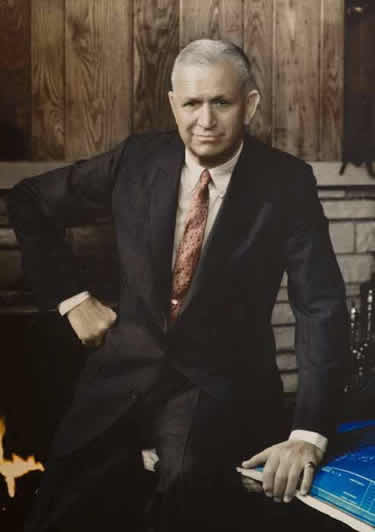
J. Willard Marriott, A.B. 1926, founder of Marriott International

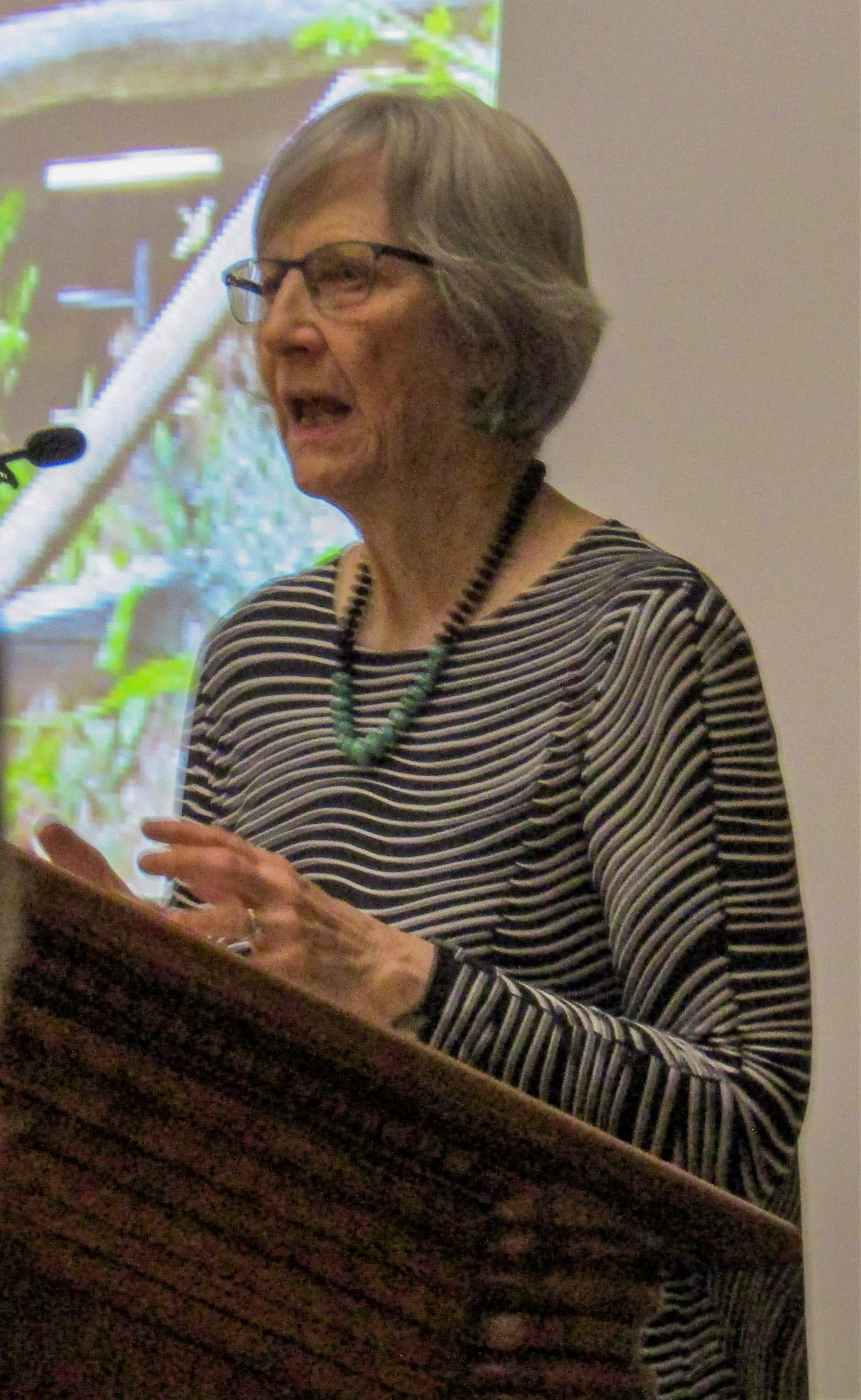
Laurel Thatcher Ulrich, B.A. 1960, received the Pulitzer Prize for History in 1991.

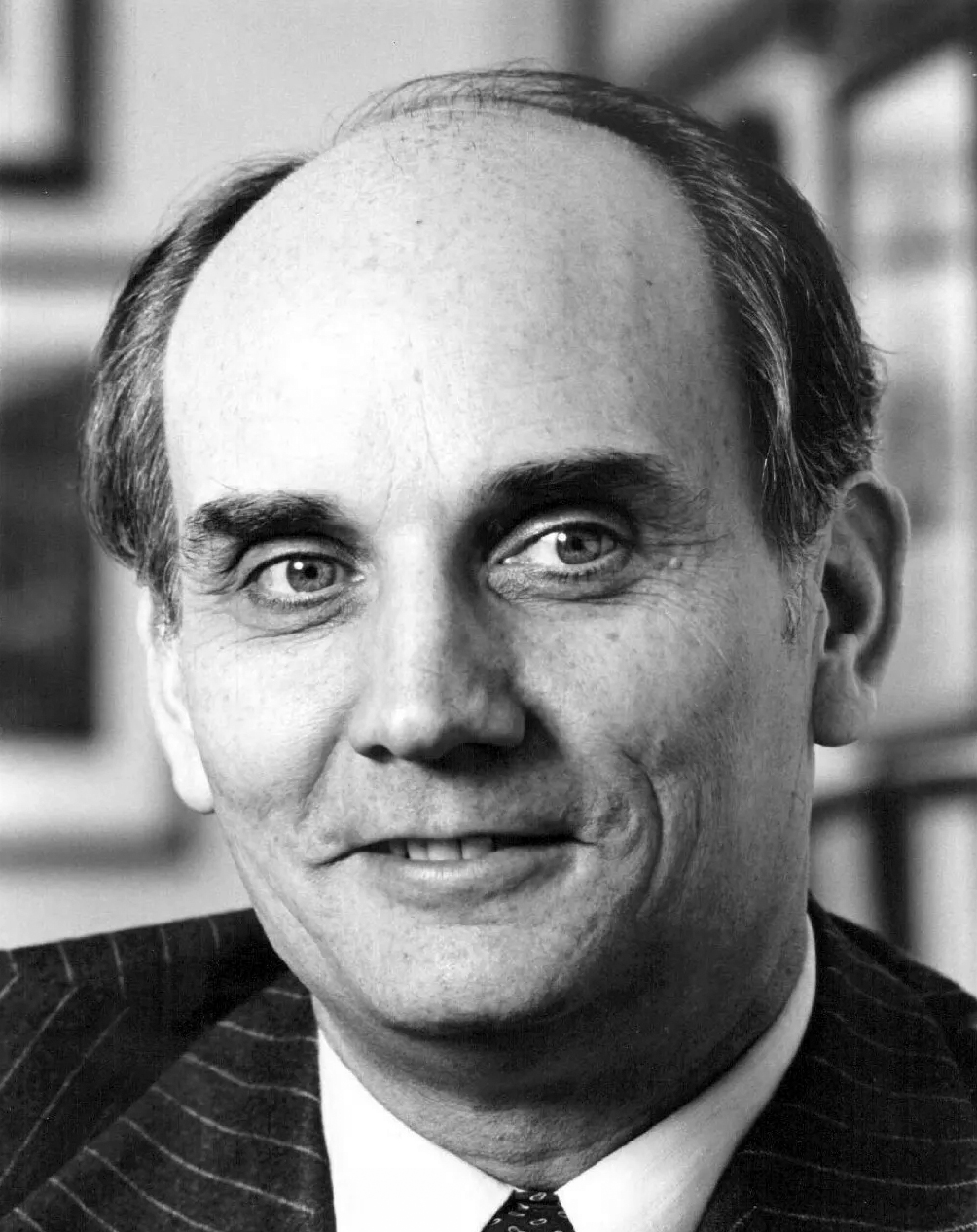
Jake Garn, B.S. 1955, U.S. senator and Space Shuttle astronaut

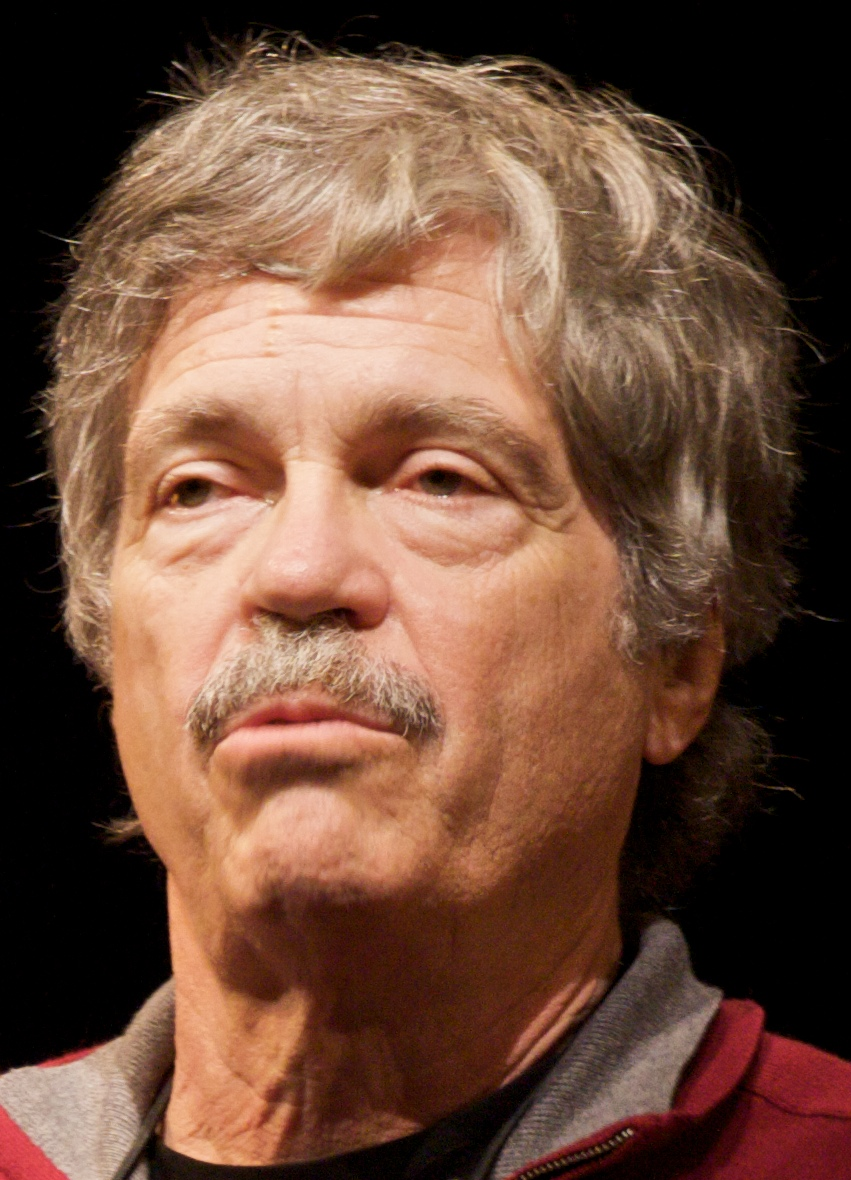
Alan Kay, M.S. 1968, Ph.D. 1969, father of Object-Oriented Programming, 2003 Turing Award and 2004 Kyoto Prize winner

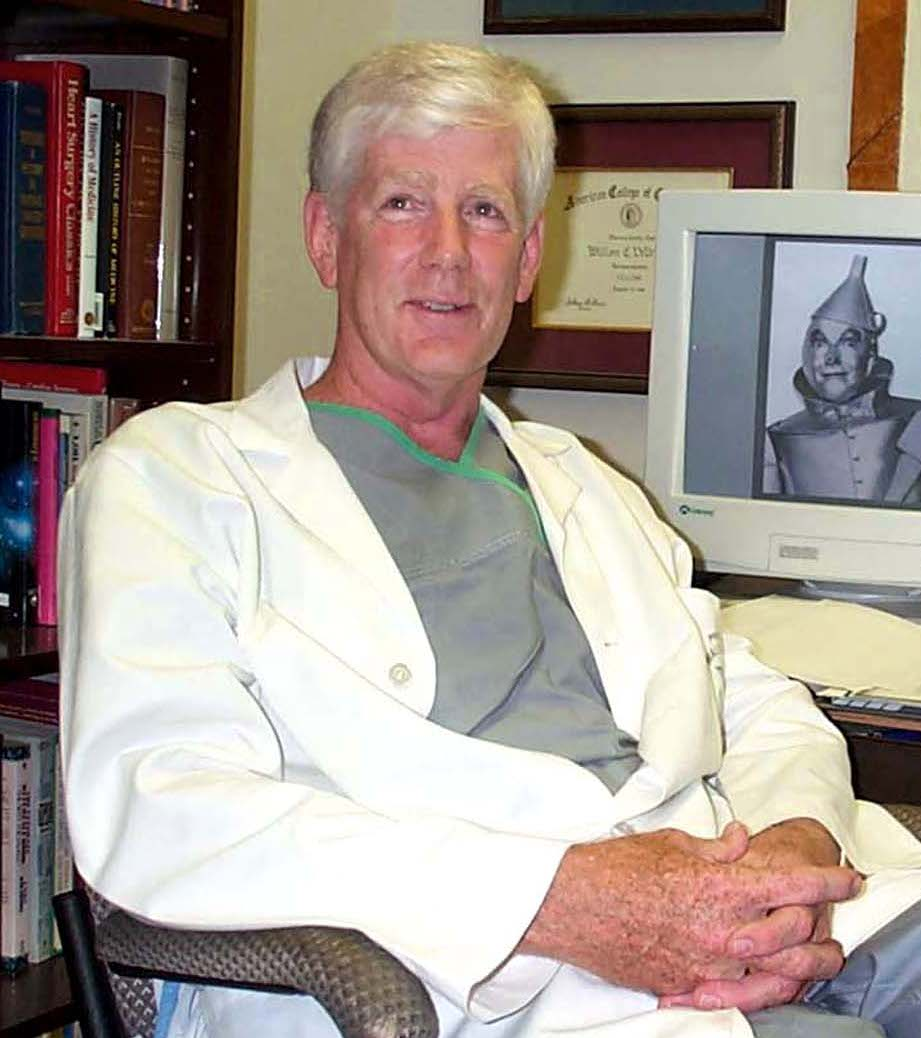
William DeVries, B.S. 1966, M.D. 1970, performed the first transplant of a total artificial heart using the Jarvik-7 model.

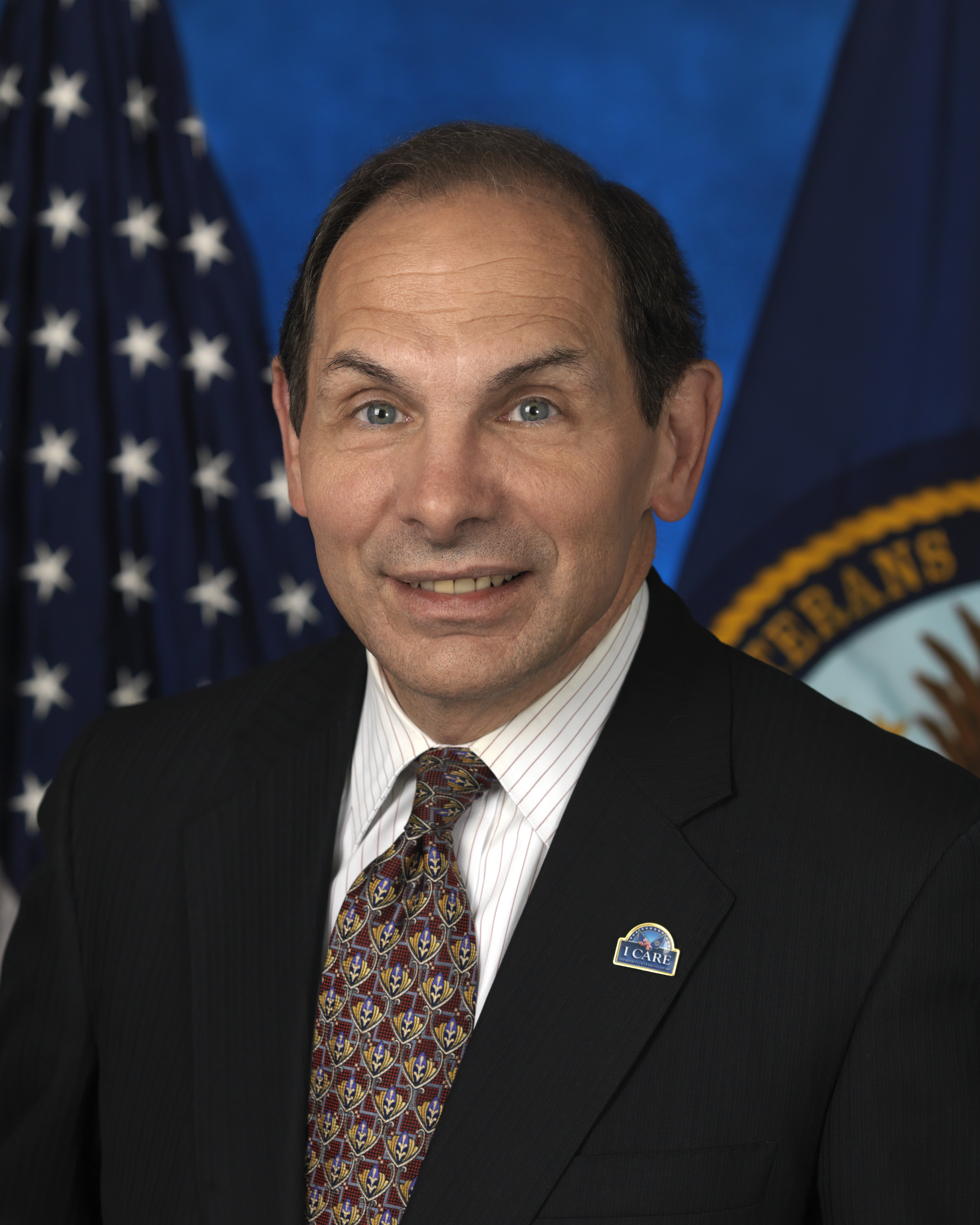
Robert A. McDonald, M.B.A. 1978, former CEO of Procter & Gamble, 8th United States Secretary of Veterans Affairs

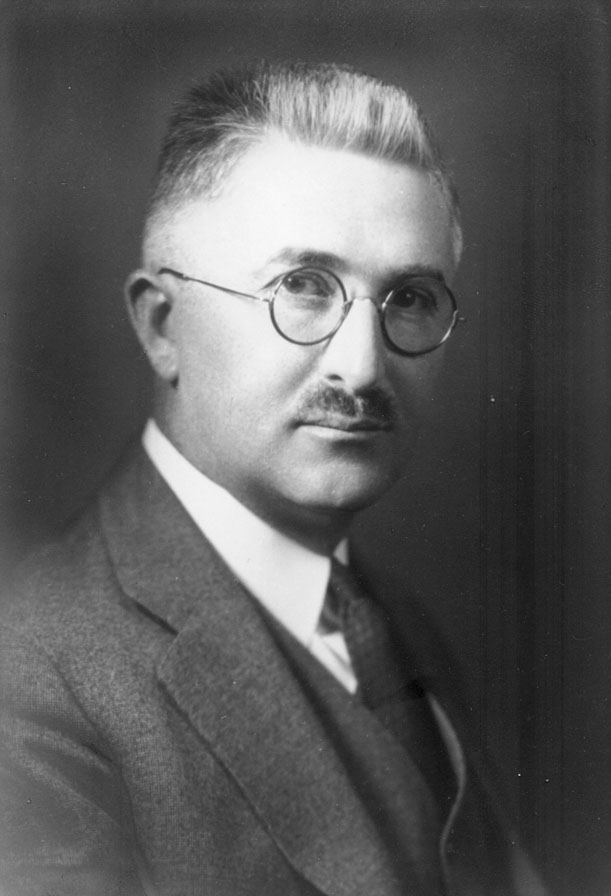
Ralph Hartley, A.B. 1909, inventor of the Hartley oscillator and the Hartley transform, recipient of the IEEE Medal of Honor

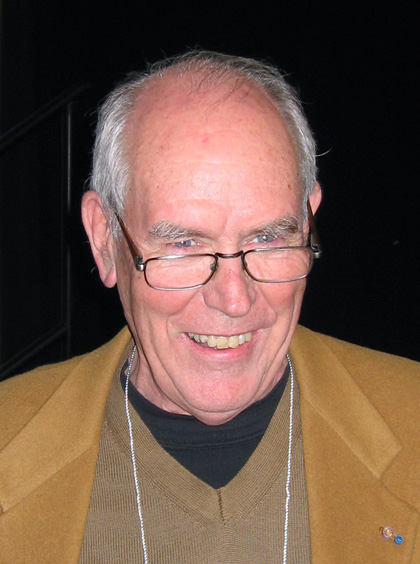
Ivan Sutherland, past Professor of Computer Science 1968–1974, winner of the Turing Award in 1988, Kyoto Prize in 2012, co-founder of Evans and Sutherland

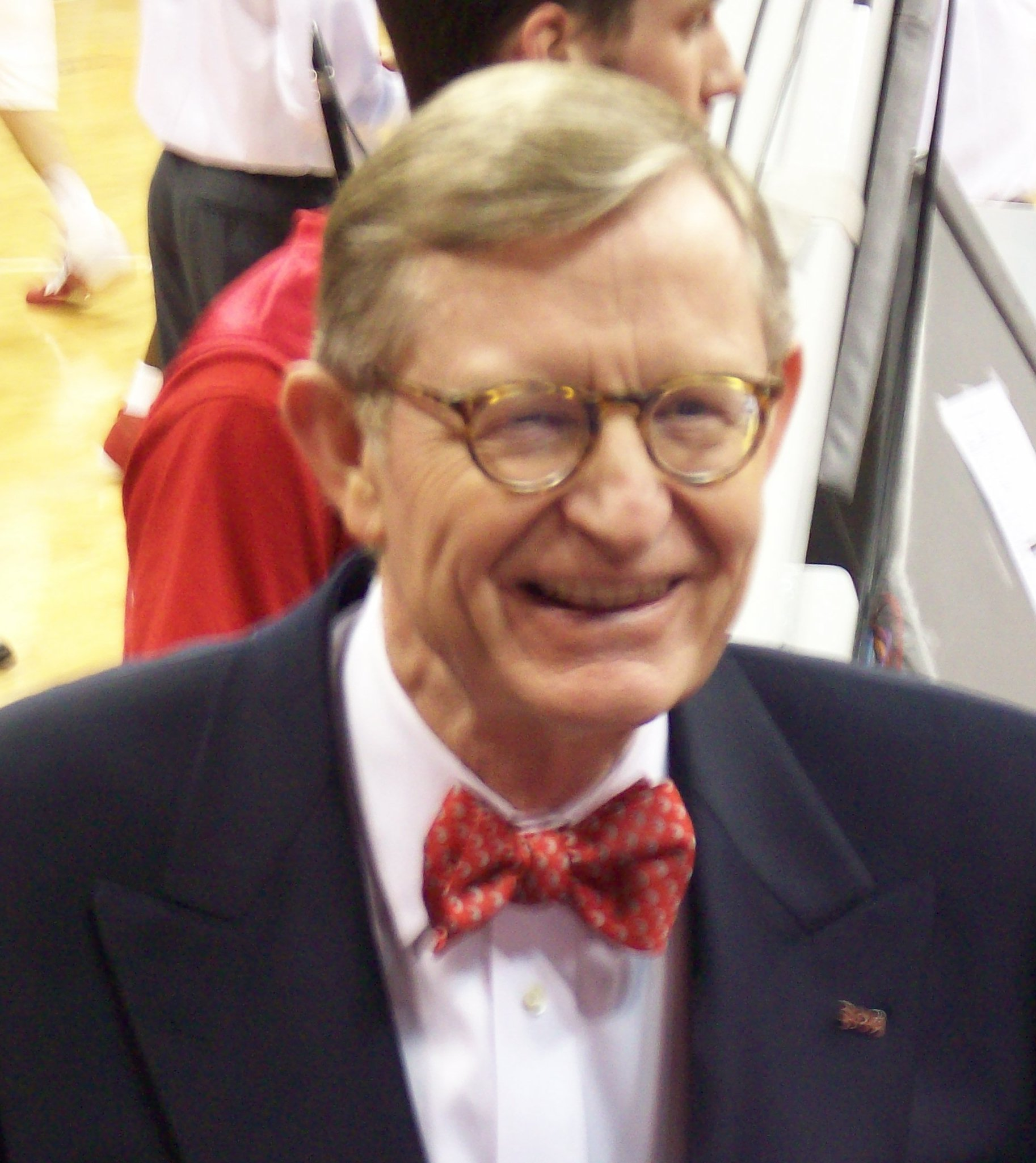
E. Gordon Gee, B.A. 1968, past president of universities including Ohio State, Vanderbilt, Brown and University of Colorado

== See also ==
- National Cold Fusion Institute - Former research institute affiliated with the university
