= David W. Grainger =

American professor (born 1961)

- Born: June 11, 1961 (age 65); Boston, Massachusetts, U.S.
- Citizenship: American
- Education: University of Utah, 1987 Ph.D., Pharmaceutical. Dartmouth College, 1983 B.A., Engineering, Chemistry minor Lewis and Clark High School, 1979, Valedictorian
- Known for: Scientific contributions in biomedical micro- and nanotechnology, drug delivery systems, and medical device innovation
- Scientific career
- Fields: Biomedical Engineering
- Workplaces: University of Utah Distinguished Professor, Chair, Biomedical Engineering
- Website: davidwgrainger.com linkedin.com/in/david-grainger-utah

David William Grainger is a distinguished professor and chair of the department of biomedical engineering and distinguished professor of pharmaceutics and pharmaceutical chemistry at the University of Utah. His research focuses on biomaterials, drug delivery, and medical device innovation.

== Personal life ==
David William Grainger III was born in Boston, Massachusetts, and grew up in Spokane, Washington. He graduated from Lewis and Clark High School in 1979 as valedictorian.

== Education ==
Grainger graduated with a B.A. degree in engineering and minor in chemistry in 1983. In 1987, Grainger completed his Ph.D. degree at the University of Utah in pharmaceutical chemistry in 1987 under National Academy member, Prof. Sung Wan Kim. His dissertation work involved synthesis of heparinized block copolymers and analysis of their blood coagulation properties in vitro and in vivo. He was awarded a postdoctoral fellowship from the Alexander von Humboldt Foundation to work with Prof. Helmut Ringsdorf at the University of Mainz, Germany. This work produced new strategies for organizing two-dimensional protein structures on planar lipid films.

== Career and research ==
Grainger's early research focused on the failure of medical implants in the human body and the problems associated with blood coagulation and infection. Grainger began his academic career as an assistant professor at the Oregon Graduate Institute. He moved to become associate professor in the department of chemistry at Colorado State University and was promoted to full professor there in 1999. In 2006, Grainger was awarded the Inaugural George S. and Dolores Doré Eccles Presidential Endowed Chair and professor in the department of pharmaceutics and pharmaceutical chemistry, health sciences, at the University of Utah. He chaired this department from 2006 to 2016, then became department chair of the department of biomedical engineering at the University of Utah, where he currently resides as a university distinguished professor.

Grainger's research focuses mainly on biomaterials and drug delivery systems in biomedical engineering applications.

=== Drug delivery ===
Much of Grainger's current research is focused on two drug delivery device issues: Drug device integration, and nanotoxicology; however, his research portfolio is quite diverse.

His work in nanotoxicology (the study of the toxicity of nanomaterials) ranges from testing drug toxicity in vitro, to investigation of infections caused by materials implanted in the body. The issue of nanotoxicity in transportation of drug particles is also an area of his expertise. Much of his work in this area focuses on finding the surface interactions at the drug-tissue, drug-material interface.

His research in drug device integration began with his work in pharmacology and nanomedicine. This moved into work in localized drug delivery devices to treat conditions like prophylaxis and insights into infection caused by implanted materials.

Additional research includes: Extensive work to characterize the functions and applications of growth factor-β, specifically its implications in conditions including Arteriosclerosis and Thrombosis, diagnosis of coronary heart disease and proliferation of human muscular tissue.

=== Biomaterials ===
Some of Grainger's work with biomaterials is focused on surface modification, patterning and analytical methods, and ultrathin protein and polymer films. In a study of functionalized poly(ethylene glycol)-based bioassays, he helped discover a new surface chemistry which inhibits nonspecific biomolecular interactions and provides the capacity for specific immobilization of desired biomolecules.

In another study involving surface chemistry, Grainger investigated organic thiol and bi-sulfide binding interactions with gold surfaces. It was common practice for self-assembled monolayer (SAM) systems to use sulfur anchor groups and gold surfaces, while the gold-sulfur bonding mechanisms had not yet been explored. The findings from this experiment showed the importance of selecting a proper solvent for SAM systems on gold surfaces
