= Scott A. Summers =

American Scientist

Scott Andrew Summers
- Born: Decatur, Illinois, United States

Scott Andrew Summers (born 1967 in Decatur, Illinois) is an American scientist and professor at the University of Utah. He co-founded Centaurus Therapeutics, a biotechnology company that develops novel ceramide-reducing therapies to treat cardiometabolic disease.

== Education ==
Summers completed his BS degree at Indiana University, PhD at Southern Illinois University, and postdoctoral fellowship at the University of Pennsylvania.

== Career ==
Summers is known for discovering that a class of fat metabolites called ceramides contribute to the tissue dysfunction that underlies diabetes and its comorbidities. Though the idea was initially controversial, it has gained traction within the medical community, to the extent that blood ceramides are now measured clinically as markers of cardiometabolic disease risk.

After running laboratories in Singapore and Australia for 8 years, Summers returned to the USA and the University of Utah in 2016 to chair a new Department of Nutrition and Integrative Physiology and serve as the Co-Director (with Jared Rutter, HHMI) of the Utah Diabetes and Metabolism Research Center. Summers was named William J. Rutter, PhD, Presidential Endowed Chair of Biochemistry in 2021 and a University of Utah Distinguished Professor in 2022.

== Selected publications ==
- Tippetts TS, Holland WL, Summers SA (2021) Cholesterol, the Devil you Know; Ceramide, the Devil you Don’t. Trends in Pharmacological Sciences 42 (12), 1082-1095
- Summers SA (2018) Could ceramides become the new cholesterol? Cell Metabolism 27(2):276-280
- Chaurasia B, Tippetts T, Monibas R, Liu J. Li Y, Wang L, Wilkerson J, Sweeney C.R, Pereira R, Sumida D, Maschek J. A., Cox J, Kaddai V, Lancaster G, Siddique M, Poss A, Pearson M, Satapati S, Zhou H, McLaren D, Previs S, Chen Y, Qian Y, Petrov A, Wu M, Shen X, Yao J, Nunes C, Howard A, Wang L, Erion M, Rutter J, Holland W, Kelley D, and Summers S. A. (2019) Targeting a Ceramide Double Bond Improves Insulin Resistance and Hepatic Steatosis. Science 365, 386-392
- Holland WL, Brozinick JT, Wang LP, Hawkins ED, Sargent KM, Liu Y, Narra K, Hoehn KL, Knotts TA, Siesky A, Nelson DH, Karathanasis SK, Fontenot GK, Birnbaum MJ and Summers SA (2007) Inhibition of ceramide synthesis ameliorates glucocorticoid-, saturated-fat-, and obesity-induced insulin resistance. Cell Metabolism 5(3), 167-79
