= Sung Wan Kim =

American pharmacologist (1940 - 2020)

- Born: August 21, 1940; Pusan, South Korea
- Died: February 24, 2020 (aged 79); Salt Lake City, Utah, U.S.

Academic background
- Education: Seoul National University (BS, MS); University of Utah (PhD)

Academic work
- Discipline: Medicinal chemistry Pharmacology
- Sub-discipline: Pharmaceutics; Drug delivery
- Institutions: University of Utah

Sung Wan Kim (August 21, 1940 – February 24, 2020) was a South Korean-American academic who worked as a distinguished professor of pharmaceutics and pharmaceutical chemistry at the University of Utah. He is the founder and co-director of the University of Utah's Center for Controlled Chemical Delivery.

== Early life and education ==
Kim was born in Pusan, South Korea. He received his B.S. and M.S. at Seoul National University in 1963 and 1965, respectively. In 1969, he received his PhD in physical chemistry at the University of Utah under Professor Henry Eyring.

== Career ==
Kim was considered a pioneer in the field of drug delivery. He was the founder of the International Symposium on Recent Advances in Drug Delivery, which is held biennially in Salt Lake City, Utah.

He was an elected member of the United States National Academies' Institute of Medicine (1999) and the National Academy of Engineering (2003). He was a Fellow in the American Association of Pharmaceutical Scientists, Biomaterials Society and American Institute for Medical and Biological Engineering.

Kim trained more than 100 scientists from 13 countries, had 25 patents and more than 550 publications. In addition to his contributions to academia, Dr. Kim was a successful entrepreneur. He was the founder of Expression Genetics, Inc., MacroMed, Inc. (Acquired by Protherics, Plc) and a co-founder of TheraTech, Inc. (Acquired by Watson Pharmaceuticals).

== Personal life ==
A naturalized U.S. citizen, Dr. Kim was married and had two children.

== Awards ==
- 1987: Clemson Basic Biomaterials Award
- Distinguished Research Award, University of Utah
- 1988: Utah Governor's Medal for Science and Technology
- 1995: Research Achievement Award in Drug Delivery, American Association of Pharmaceutical Scientists
- Founders Award, Controlled Release Society
- 1996: Japanese Biomaterials Research Award
- 1998: Volwiler Award, American Association of Colleges of Pharmacy
- 2002: Dale Wurster Award, American Association of Pharmaceutical Scientists
- 2003: Ho-am Prize in Medicine, Rosenblatt Prize for Excellence
- 2006: honorary doctorate, Twente University
- 2014: Terumo Global Science Prize

He was awarded the Outstanding Paper in the Journal of Controlled Release three times, in 1989, 1991, and 1998.
