= Salt Lake City Bicycle Collective =

SLC Bicycle Collective
- Formation: 2002; 24 years ago
- Legal status: 501(c)(3) organization
- Headquarters: 325 West 900 South
- Location: Salt Lake City, Utah, United States
- Exec. Dir.: Donna Matturro McAleer
- Website: bicyclecollective.org

The Salt Lake City Bicycle Collective is a bicycle cooperative in Salt Lake City, Utah.

The Bicycle Collective refurbish donated used bikes and sells them to community members or donates them to individuals in need. The Bicycle Collective also offers various educational programs, such as general bicycle maintenance courses, educational courses specifically for children, and a women's night.

== History ==
The Salt Lake City Bicycle Collective is a nonprofit organization founded in 2002.

== Programs ==
The Salt Lake City Bicycle Collective offers charitable services and educational programs, including:

- Community Bike Shop Through this program members of the public are welcome to use the workstands and tools to work on their own bike, with assistance from Bicycle Collective employees and volunteers. Refurbished bicycles are also available for sale during this program.
- Youth Open Shop Youth Open Shop is designed to be a safe environment where youth can learn basic bicycle mechanic skills and work towards earning a bike.
- Goodwill Bikes The Bicycle Collective refurbishes donated bikes and donates them to individuals with financial need.
- Bike Valet The Collective operates bicycle parking services at various events throughout the city, typically free of charge to the rider.
