= University of Utah presidents =

The University of Utah presidents include all sixteen men and women who served as president of the University of Utah or its predecessor the University of Deseret, which was founded in 1850 just a few years after the Mormon Pioneers arrived in the Salt Lake Valley.

== List of presidents ==
According to the university's official count the current president, Taylor Randall, is the 17th president of the University. The university only counts the presidents that have served since the name was officially changed to the University of Utah, starting with John R. Park. The count also only counts the presidents, not the actual terms, because Joseph T. Kingsbury was president two different times.

| No. | President | Term start | Term end | Notes |
|---|---|---|---|---|
Chancellors of the University of Deseret (1850–1892)
| – | Orson Spencer (Note: Orson Spencer was named as the first chancellor of the University of Deseret when it was created on February 28, 1850. His tenure only lasted a short time until the university was temporarily closed.) | 1850 | 1852 | |
| – | NONE (Note: The University of Deseret was suspended for fifteen years due to the lack of funds and "feeder" schools.) | 1852 | 1867 | |
| – | David O. Calder (Note: David O. Calder was a Mormon Pioneer from Scotland who was assigned by Brigham Young to re-open the University after its fifteen-year closure.) | 1867 | 1869 | |
Presidents of the University of Utah (1892–present)
| 1 | John R. Park (Note: John R. Park is the longest tenured president in the history of the University of Utah, serving for 23 years. At the end of his tenure the name of the university was changed to The University of Utah and planning began to move the campus to the east bench of Salt Lake City. Upon his death in 1900, Dr. John R. Park bequeathed his entire fortune, plus his library, to the University of Utah.) | 1869 | 1892 | |
| acting | Joseph T. Kingsbury (Note: Joseph T. Kingsbury became the first president of the university to have actually attended the university.) | 1892 | 1894 | |
| 2 | James E. Talmage | 1894 | 1897 | |
| 3 | Joseph T. Kingsbury (Note: For the second time Kingsbury was appointed as the president of the University of Utah, this time serving for nearly twenty years.) | 1897 | 1916 | |
| 4 | John A. Widtsoe (Note: John A. Widtsoe was the president of Utah State University from 1907 until 1916 when he became the president of the University of Utah. He continued as president until he was called as a member of the Quorum of the Twelve in the LDS church. The University of Utah, Utah State, and BYU all have buildings named after him.) | 1916 | 1921 | |
| 5 | George Thomas | 1921 | 1941 | |
| 6 | LeRoy E. Cowles (Note: His presidency, 1941–46, spanned the World War II years. Classes were added in military science, economics and philosophy of war and programs began in Army pre-flight, Navy V-1 and R.O.T.C. One of the far-reaching academic achievements of the period was expansion of the medical program into a four-year medical school. In 1980 one of the first three buildings on the campus was renamed in his honor. The LeRoy E. Cowles Building currently houses Mathematics.) | 1941 | 1946 | |
| 7 | A. Ray Olpin (Note: During A. Ray Olpin's presidency the university quadrupled in size and the enrollment tripled from 4,000 to 12,000 students. The current student union building at the university is named in his honor.) | 1946 | 1964 | |
| 8 | James C. Fletcher (Note: James C. Fletcher was the president at the university from 1964 until he became the Administrator of the National Aeronautics and Space Administration in 1971.) | 1964 | 1971 | |
| 9 | Alfred C. Emery | 1971 | 1973 | |
| 10 | David P. Gardner | August 1, 1973 | July 31, 1983 (Note: Resigned to lead the University of California system.) | |
| 11 | Chase N. Peterson | August 1, 1983 | June 30, 1991 (Note: Forced to resign/retire as a result over cold fusion research expenditures.) | |
| interim | Jerilyn McIntyre | July 1, 1991 | August 31, 1991 | |
| 12 | Arthur K. Smith | September 1, 1991 | January 15, 1997 (Note: Resigned to lead the University of Houston.) | |
| acting | Jerilyn McIntyre | January 16, 1997 | March 31, 1997 | |
| interim | Jerilyn McIntyre | April 1, 1997 | December 31, 1997 | |
| 13 | Bernie Machen | January 1, 1998 | December 31, 2003 (Note: Resigned to lead the University of Florida.) | |
| interim | Lorris Betz | January 1, 2004 | July 31, 2004 | |
| 14 | Michael K. Young | August 1, 2004 | May 15, 2011 (Note: Resigned to lead the University of Washington.) | |
| interim | Lorris Betz | May 16, 2011 | March 11, 2012 | |
| 15 | David W. Pershing | March 12, 2012 | April 1, 2018 | |
| 16 | Ruth Watkins | April 2, 2018 | April 7, 2021 (Note: Resigned to lead Strada Impact.) | |
| interim | Michael L. Good | April 8, 2021 | August 8, 2021 | |
| 17 | Taylor R. Randall | August 9, 2021 | Present | |

Table notes:

== Timeline of presidential terms ==
Presidents of the University of Utah
