= Huntsman Leadership Scholar =

The title of Huntsman Leadership Scholar is bestowed upon undergraduate members of the Sigma Chi Fraternity following successful completion of the Sigma Chi Horizons Huntsman Leadership Summit located in Snowbird, Utah between academic years.

In 2015, Jon M. Huntsman, a "Significant Sig", donated enough to fund the Horizons Huntsman Leadership Summit throughout the next decade.

This title is awarded to graduates of the Horizons Huntsman Leadership Summit. Each session of Horizons consists of 48 members. To date, about 1% of Sigma Chi initiates, dead and alive, are graduates of the program.
