= Beckerle =

Beckerle is a surname. Notable people with the name include:

- Adolf-Heinz Beckerle (1902–1976), German politician
- Mary Beckerle, American cell biologist
