= Ruth Watkins =

American academic and university president

Ruth V. Watkins
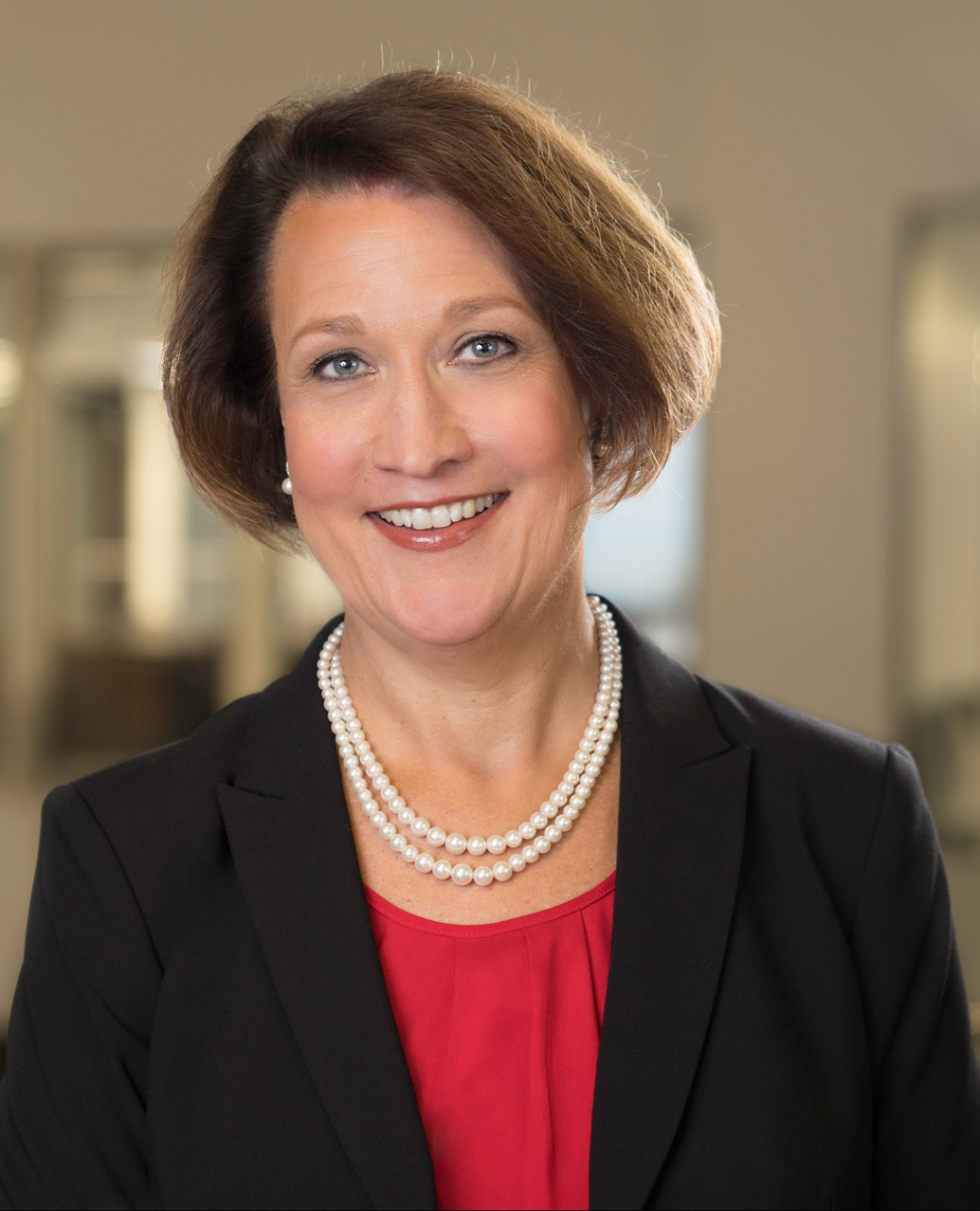

16th President of the University of Utah
- In office April 2, 2018 – April 7, 2021
- Preceded by: David W. Pershing
- Succeeded by: Taylor R. Randall

Provost & Senior Vice President for Academic Affairs of the University of Utah
- In office August 1, 2013 – April 2, 2018
- Preceded by: David W. Pershing
- Succeeded by: Daniel A. Reed

Personal details
- Education: University of Northern Iowa (B.S.); University of Kansas (M.S.); University of Kansas (Ph.D.)
- Profession: University Administrator

Academic background
- Thesis: Verb particle and preposition acquisition in language-impaired and normally developing children (1989)
- Doctoral advisor: Mabel Rice

Academic work
- Discipline: Linguistics
- Sub-discipline: speech pathology
- Institutions: University of Texas at Dallas; University of Illinois at Urbana-Champaign; University of Utah

Ruth V. Watkins is a student of speech language pathology, and the former president of the University of Utah. She stepped down from the role on April 7, 2021, to enter the private sector.

== Education ==
Watkins completed a bachelor's degree in speech-language pathology, graduating from the University of Northern Iowa with highest honors in 1985. She completed her graduate work at the University of Kansas, earning a master's degree in child language/speech-language pathology in 1987, and a PhD in child language in 1989. Additionally, she has a certificate of clinical competence in speech-language pathology. In 2003, she was named a fellow of the American Speech-Language-Hearing Association.

== Career ==
In 1989, Watkins was appointed as an assistant professor at the University of Texas at Dallas, as well as program director of the Callier Center for Communication Disorders, where she worked until 1993. Later that year, she moved to the University of Illinois at Urbana-Champaign as an assistant professor, and was appointed associate dean for academic and research affairs in the College of Applied Life Studies in 2000, then associate provost responsible for undergraduate education and academic affairs in 2003. She served in this capacity until she was promoted to vice provost, a post she held from 2006 to 2008. In 2008, she was named dean of the College of Liberal Arts and Sciences, which included approximately 600 faculty, 2,500 graduate students, and 12,000 undergraduate students, with an annual operating budget of about $142 million.

On April 4, 2013, it was announced that Watkins would assume the post of Provost and Senior Vice President for Academic Affairs at the University of Utah (U of U). She officially began in this capacity on August 1, 2013, also receiving an appointment as a full professor in the Department of Linguistics. Her work in this position has included advocacy for better online education and an emphasis on cross-disciplinary science, including support for interdisciplinary cluster hires via her creation of the Transformative Excellence Program.

On January 18, 2018, Watkins was appointed as the 16th president of the U of U. She officially assumed this position on April 2, 2018, and was the first woman to serve in the post. Attendees at her September 21, 2018 inauguration included the chair of the U of U's board of trustees, H. David Burton, and Utah Lieutenant Governor, Spencer Cox.

== Murder of Lauren McCluskey ==
Watkins was questioned for the university's actions in and response to the murder on campus of track athlete Lauren McCluskey in 2018, including her "insistence shortly after the murder that there wasn't 'any reason to believe this tragedy could have been prevented'."

Watkins faced criticism from the student-run newspaper, The Daily Utah Chronicle.

In a press conference on the second anniversary of the murder, announcing a $13.5 million settlement to a foundation in McCluskey's name which will promote campus safety, Watkins stated the university had "failed Lauren."

On January 12, 2021, Watkins announced that she would be stepping down as president of the University of Utah as of April 7, 2021 to become president of Strada Impact. When asked to comment, McCluskey's mother Jill indicated she and her husband "wish Watkins the best in her future endeavors" and would continue to work with campus leaders to improve safety.
