= Aventri =

American event management software company

Aventri, Inc.
- Formerly: Etouches
- Type: Private
- Industry: Cloud-software, Event management
- Founded: 1998
- Founder: Leonora Valvo
- Headquarters: Norwalk, Connecticut
- Area served: North America; Europe; Middle East; Asian-Pacific
- Services: Event management Saas
- Website: www.aventri.com

Aventri, formerly known as Etouches, is a cloud-based event management software company based in Norwalk, Connecticut best known for its integrated events management SaaS solutions. The company has over 1,200 users spanning 35 countries worldwide, with corporations such as Coca-Cola, MasterCard and Dell part of its client mix. Aventri is a five-time honoree on magazine's Inc. 5,000 ranking of the fastest-growing private companies in America (2012 — 2016). The annual ranking also places Aventri among the top companies in Connecticut.

== History ==
=== Global Executive Business Service — 1998 ===
Aventri was founded as Global Executive Business Service in 1998 by Leonora Valvo and Tim Cummins. The business operated as a fee-for-service event managing company.

=== etouches — 2008 ===
In 2008, the company relaunched as Etouches. That same year, Etouches introduced its first event management solution. In 2010, the company raised $2.5 million in the first round of venture capital investments. The lead investor was Greycroft Partners, and other investors were Connecticut Innovations and Cava Capital.

The business released its mobile app, eMobile, in 2012 so that consumers could schedule events on their cellphones. The application integrates with other etouches modules, including eReg and eSocial. Also that year, etouches received $7.75 million in Series B financing led by Level Equity.

Etouches raised $6 million in Series C round investments in 2013. In September of that year, the company appointed Oni Chukwu as president and chief executive officer. The veteran software industry executive sits on the Board of Directors of the Connecticut Technology Council and the Board of Governors for the University of New Haven. etouches expanded operations in the Middle East with the opening of a headquarters office in Dubai in 2015. The company raised $14 million in Series C funding through investors including Argentum Group, Also that year, etouches expanded its platform with the acquisition of TapCrowd, a company that creates mobile applications and provides marketing data for businesses and associations worldwide. A new partnership integrated the InGo social media marketing suite into the etouches event management platform. The company also acquired Inevention, a venue sourcing platform with an estimating tool to help planners manage the cost of offsite meetings and events.

Rapid growth earned Etouches a spot on Deloitte's 2015 Technology Fast 500 list of the fastest-growing technology companies in North America. Also that year, SmartCEO magazine honored Chukwu with its New York Future 50 award, recognizing the region's fastest-growing, mid-sized companies.

Etouches continued to develop its end-to-end event management platform for the enterprise market throughout 2016. The company closed a $20 million funding round. Later that year, it acquired venue sourcing and booking platform Zentila. Etouches also introduced its event ROI product. etouches also integrates directly with other popular software, including Salesforce and Passkey.

On March 2, 2017, Etouches acquired LOOPD, a leading onsite data-drive technology. Two months later, on May 9, 2017, etouches was acquired by HGGC, a leading middle market private equity firm. HGGC's investment helped etouches expand its business and further invest in its market-leading cloud platform to win a greater share of the $6 billion Event Management Software (EMS) and venue sourcing market.

=== Aventri — 2018 ===
On July 12, 2018, the company rebranded to Aventri.

=== Acquisition by Meetingplay and Stova rebranding — 2022 ===
Meetingplay acquired Aventri for an undisclosed amount and both companies re-branded under a new company name, Stova.

== Locations ==
Aventri is headquartered in Norwalk, Connecticut, USA with offices throughout North America and in Europe, the Middle East, and Asian Pacific. The company offers multilingual and multi-currency product versions to accommodate its global customer base.
