= Gary Crittenden =

American financial manager

Gary L. Crittenden
- Born: 1953 (age 72–73)
- Education: Brigham Young University (B.S.); Harvard University (M.B.A.)
- Occupation: Financial manager
- Employer(s): CEO, Huntsman Gay Global Capital
- Spouse: Catherine Jean Cox
- Children: 3

Gary Lewis Crittenden (born 1953) is an American financial manager. He is an executive director of HGGC, and was previously CEO and chairman. He is also the former chairman of Citi Holdings. He was chairman of Citadel, Power Holdings, and iQor; lead independent director of Pluralsight; and has been on the boards of Extra Space Storage, Staples Inc., Ryerson, Inc., TJX Companies, and Utah Capital Investment Corp. From 2000 to 2007, Crittenden was executive vice president and chief financial officer (CFO) of American Express, and from March 2007 to March 2009, he was the chief financial officer of Citigroup.

== Early life and education ==
Crittenden was raised in Ogden, Utah. He was the student body president at Ogden High School in 1971. He did a two-year mission for the Church of Jesus Christ of Latter-day Saints (LDS Church) in Germany, and graduated from BYU's Marriott School of Management with a Bachelor of Science degree in management in 1976. He went on to earn an MBA from Harvard Business School in 1979.

== Career ==
Crittenden began his career as a consultant at Bain and Company where he worked on various strategic projects in the United States and Germany. Crittenden was CFO and executive vice president at Melville Corp. While at Melville, he was the architect of the breakup of the company that led a significant increase in share price as the company was split into three firms. He was the CFO of Sears Roebuck and Company from 1997 to 1998. He then was CFO of Monsanto Company from 1998 to 2000. At Monsanto, Crittenden led the efforts to acquire seed companies DeKalb Genetics Corporation, and the Delta and Pine Land Company. He also played a key role in the eventual sale of Monsanto to Pharmacia & Upjohn. Prior to joining Citigroup, Crittenden was executive vice president and chief financial officer (CFO) of American Express, as well as the head of the company's Global Network Services division.

In 2007, Crittenden joined Citigroup as CFO. When the global financial markets tumbled into the Great Recession, Crittenden guided Citigroup's financial management and recovery, cutting 75,000 jobs and reduced assets by around $500 billion. In 2010 Crittenden and the company settled claims of disclosure errors brought by the SEC, without admitting wrongdoing on the part of Crittenden, in connection with Citigroup's exposure to subprime mortgage assets.

In April 2012, Crittenden was named CEO of Huntsman Gay Global Capital. In his first year at HGGC, Crittenden oversaw the sale of the utilities services holding company Power Holdings to Kelso & Co. for $380 million. Prior to Crittenden's arrival, Huntsman Gay Global Capital created Power Holdings by acquiring several utilities services throughout the United States. In just over two years, Power Holdings grew from approximately 90 utility crews to more than 200 crews. Crittenden and HGGC completed the sale via the $1.1 billion Huntsman Gay Capital Partners Fund I LP.

In 2013, Crittenden became the chairman of Huntsman Gay Global Capital (HGGC) after co-founder Richard Lawson took over as chief executive. As chairman of HGCC, Crittenden oversaw the establishment of the firm's second vehicle, Fund II. Fund II will generally adhere to HGGC investment criteria such as revenues of $100 million or more, enterprise values of $100–500 million, and EBITDA of at least $15 million.

In December 2013, Crittenden oversaw the acquisition of Lucent Polymers by the HGGC company Citadel Plastics Holdings, a top global thermoplastics and thermoset resins compounder. The acquisition gave Citadel Plastics access to a portfolio of over 1,400 formulations and enhanced its position in the engineered resins sector. Crittenden heralded the acquisition as a prime example of growth via strategic acquisition and integration of successful, complementary businesses. According to Crittenden, Citadel Plastics will benefit greatly from the financial strength and blue-chip customer base of Lucent, as well as its numerous development initiatives. The Lucent acquisition was Citadel's seventh since 2007 and the 31st overall acquisition for HGGC.

Crittenden is chairman of iQor, a business process outsourcing services provider based in New York City. In January 2014, iQor acquired the aftermarket services business of Jabil Circuit, Inc. for $725 million. Headquartered in St. Petersburg, Florida, Jabil Aftermarket Services stands as the top aftermarket services provider in industries such as consumer devices, mobility, telecommunications, medical devices, and computing. The transaction boosts iQor revenues to over $1.5 billion and increases its employee count to more than 31,000 individuals across 16 countries. According to Crittenden, the acquisition helps iQor's customers benefit from a "considerably larger global footprint and additional financial resources."

Crittenden has been on a number of corporate boards in his professional life, including Filene's Basement, where he was CFO early in his career, Wilson's Leather, Sears of Mexico and Sears Canada (where he was CFO of the parent company, Sears Roebuck and Company), Ryerson, Inc., TJX Companies (parent company to TJ Maxx and Marshalls), Staples, and Primerica. Additionally, he is chairman of the board of the HGGC portfolio companies: Power Holdings, iQor, and Citadel.

== Personal life ==
Crittenden is married to the former Catherine Jean Cox and they have three children. He is a member of the Church of Jesus Christ of Latter-day Saints (LDS Church) and served a two-year mission in Germany as a youth. He has been in several leadership positions in the church including bishop, stake president (of the Yorktown New York Stake), and area seventy. In 2017, Crittenden became managing director of the LDS Church's Missionary Department.

== Awards and honors ==
- Honorary doctorate from Weber State University in 2003
- Named one of Institutional Investor's Best CFOs in America in 2004 and 2006
