= Leach Teaching Gardens - Texas A&M University =

Coordinates: 30°36′26″N 96°21′5″W

The Leach Teaching Gardens, also known as The Gardens at Texas A&M University, is a 27-acre (11 ha) master-planned public garden on the West Campus of Texas A&M University. The first phase, a 7-acre (2.8 ha) area which opened in 2018, is a public teaching garden. The gardens are located in College Station, Texas, at the corner of Horticulture and Discovery drives. The gardens are situated within the Texas A&M AgriLife complex, close to Reed Arena. The gardens, which are free and open to the public, serve as the "multi-million-dollar centerpiece" of the AgriLife complex and function as an outdoor "living classroom" for educational, inspirational, and recreational use.

== History ==
The concept for The Gardens began in 1998 when the Texas A&M Board of Regents designated White Creek and the surrounding riparian area as "The West Campus Greenway" to protect green space on the growing campus. The project was an ambitious plan to transform a 40-acre plot of land on West Campus. The idea was first described by Doug Welsh, a professor and AgriLife Extension horticulturist emeritus. In 2011, Former Vice Chancellor and Dean Dr. Mark Hussey '79 initiated a project to develop the area into a public garden with a purpose focused on teaching, research, and outreach. Visible construction on the first phase began in January 2015, starting with the restoration and stabilization of White Creek. In July 2016, Joseph Johnson was hired as program manager to oversee the construction. The Leach Teaching Gardens, representing Phase I of the project, officially opened with a ribbon-cutting ceremony on June 15, 2018, at 9:30 a.m. The gardens are named for lead donors Amy '84 and Tim Leach '82 of Midland, Texas, who also led the fundraising effort for the project. At the opening, Texas A&M University System Chancellor John Sharp called the gardens "transformative of the west campus." Then-university president Michael K. Young noted the project's connection to the university's land-grant history, and Dr. Patrick Stover, vice chancellor for agriculture and life sciences, called it a "source of pride" for both the university and the community. The master plan for the full 27-acre project was initially developed by graduate students from the Texas A&M Landscape Architecture program; this plan was later revised by Rottenberry Wellen Architects and White Oak Studio and overseen by Doug Welsh. Michael Arnold, a professor in the university's Department of Horticultural Sciences, serves as director of The Gardens.

== Features ==
The 7-acre garden is an outdoor classroom focused on teaching and demonstration, including proving that plants can be grown on challenging terrain. Phase I includes 21 themed gardens or "rooms", an outdoor classroom, an event lawn, a demonstration area, a rain garden, Earth-Kind plantings, and a climate-controlled pavilion. The pavilion is an octagon-shaped structure with a design inspired by historic German dance halls and garden gazebos, which hosts banquets, seminars, and demonstrations. The gardens were designed to feature a plant collection adapted to the local climate, native soil, and irrigated with domestic water. The collection includes over 250 species of plants and more than 300 trees, including eight pecan, eight citrus, 19 fruit trees, and over 143 ornamental trees. The gardens showcase sustainable horticultural practices. Examples include a bioswale at the entrance, which serves as an experiment to test which plants best filter surface run-off water, and a "WaterFence" used for rainwater collection. The themed gardens are designed to be accessible, with the goal of presenting garden plans that visitors can replicate in a home setting. Notable themed gardens include:

Edna Fuchs Memorial Rose Bed

Mexican Heritage Garden (given by the Meta Alice Keith Bratten Foundation), which features native plants from Mexico and a hand-carved stone fountain.

German and Czech Heritage Gardens

Butterfly and Bee Garden (given by Elizabeth A. '79 and Gary B. Young '77)

Leach Vineyard, which features a comprehensive viticulture exhibit.

Food and Fiber Fields, which features a center-pivot irrigation system.

A "Century Oak II", planted to continue the legacy of the university's main Century Oak.

== Mission and programming ==
The stated mission of The Gardens is "to engage the community in a living teaching environment, encourage curiosity and discovery and develop wonder for the natural world." Programming at the gardens is focused on four core areas:

Education – Focuses on topics such as water conservation, sustainable agriculture, and eco-friendly gardening. University classes may use the gardens to observe wildlife, grow food, or test landscape design techniques.

Wellness – Provides a space for relaxation and mindfulness to improve quality-of-life on campus.

Discovery – Serves as a resource for STEM education and research.

Culture and Community – Hosts seasonal events, cooking classes, and entertainment. Community events have included yoga, wine tastings, and educational classes for children.

== Future phases ==
Future phases of "The Gardens at Texas A&M University" plan to expand the project to 27 acres. Planned additions include a "family/children's garden", a rose garden, a "feed-the-world" themed courtyard, outdoor learning laboratories, and a recreation of The Grove, an outdoor amphitheater originally located on main campus that hosted concerts, movies, and events.
