= David W. Pershing =

American educator (born 1948)

15th President of University of Utah
- In office March 1, 2012 – April 2, 2018
- Preceded by: Michael K. Young
- Succeeded by: Ruth V. Watkins

Personal details
- Born: October 2, 1948 (age 78) Anderson, Indiana
- Spouses: Lynn Kennard Pershing (m. 1978–2004) Sandra J. Pershing (m. 2009–2022)
- Education: Purdue University (B.S.); University of Arizona (Ph.D.)
- Profession: University Administrator
- Scientific career
- Fields: Chemical engineering
- Workplaces: University of Utah
- Thesis: Nitrogen oxide formation in pulverized coal flames (1976)
- Doctoral advisor: Jost Wendt

David W. Pershing is an American educator and former president of the University of Utah. He received a bachelor's degree from Purdue University in 1970 and a PhD from University of Arizona.

== Career ==
Pershing joined the faculty of the University of Utah in 1977 as a professor of chemical engineering. He was named a Presidential Young Investigator by the National Science Foundation in 1984 and became dean of the College of Engineering in 1987. He was named a Distinguished Professor of Chemical Engineering in 1995. In 1998, university President Bernie Machen named Pershing as senior vice president for Academic Affairs. In March 2012, Pershing was named president of the University of Utah, where he also holds an appointment as a distinguished professor of chemical engineering.

== Mary Beckerle controversy ==
In April 2017, he was involved in the controversial firing of Mary Beckerle, CEO and director of the university's Huntsman Cancer Institute. Pershing soon reinstated Beckerle following protests from members of the university community and the Huntsman family. On 28 April, the university's senior vice president for Health Sciences, Vivian Lee, announced her resignation in the wake of the Beckerle incident. During a meeting of the university's Academic Senate on May 1, Pershing announced his own resignation, stating that it was in part "so that the person picking the new VP [of Health Sciences] is the new president." Pershing continued serving as president during the search for his successor. Ruth V. Watkins was selected, and succeeded Pershing on 2 April 2018, at which time he rejoined the faculty of engineering.
