= Peter R. Huntsman =

American business executive (born 1963)

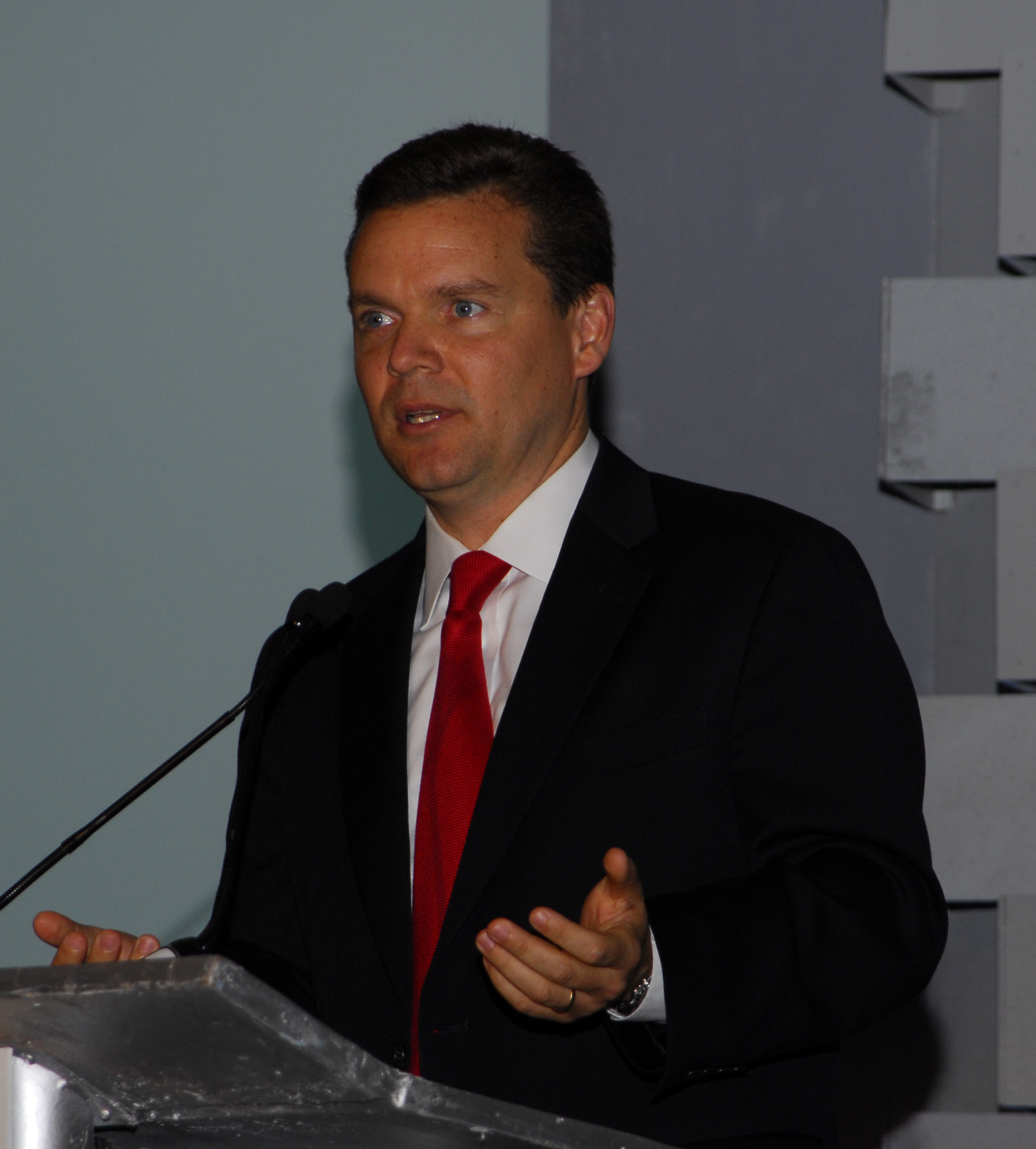
- Born: Peter Riley Huntsman; March 13, 1963 (age 63); Los Angeles, California, U.S.
- Father: Jon Huntsman Sr.
- Relatives: Jon Huntsman Jr. (brother)

Peter Riley Huntsman (born March 13, 1963) is an American businessman; the chairman of the board, president, and CEO of Huntsman Corporation. His father, Jon Huntsman Sr., founded the Huntsman Corporation and his brother, Jon Huntsman Jr., is a former United States ambassador and former governor of Utah.

== Career ==
Huntsman is chairman of the board, president, and chief executive officer of Huntsman Corporation and sits on the litigation committee. He has worked in various capacities with the Huntsman Corporation since 1983. Prior to his appointment in January 2018 as chairman of the board, Huntsman was president and CEO since July 2000 and had been president and chief operating officer since 1994. In 1987, he joined Huntsman Polypropylene Corporation as vice president before working as senior vice president and general manager. He has been president of Olympus Oil, senior vice president of Huntsman Chemical Corporation, and a senior vice president of Huntsman Packaging Corporation, a former subsidiary of Huntsman Corp. He is chairman of the board of directors of Venator Materials, a publicly traded subsidiary. He is a director or manager, as applicable, of Huntsman International and certain of other subsidiaries.

Huntsman has been on numerous boards, including for Memorial Hermann Health System beginning in 2015. He has been on the Board of Overseers for the Wharton School of Business and the Boards of Advisors for Interfaith of The Woodlands. In 2015, Huntsman was named CEO of both the Huntsman Foundation and the Huntsman Cancer Foundation, two philanthropic groups established by the family.

Huntsman was named as a "Who's Who in Energy" honoree by the Houston Business Journal in 2015.

== Personal life ==
Huntsman is married to Brynn Ballard, daughter of M. Russell Ballard, a former apostle in the Church of Jesus Christ of Latter-day Saints. They have eight children.
