= Vivian Lee =

American radiologist

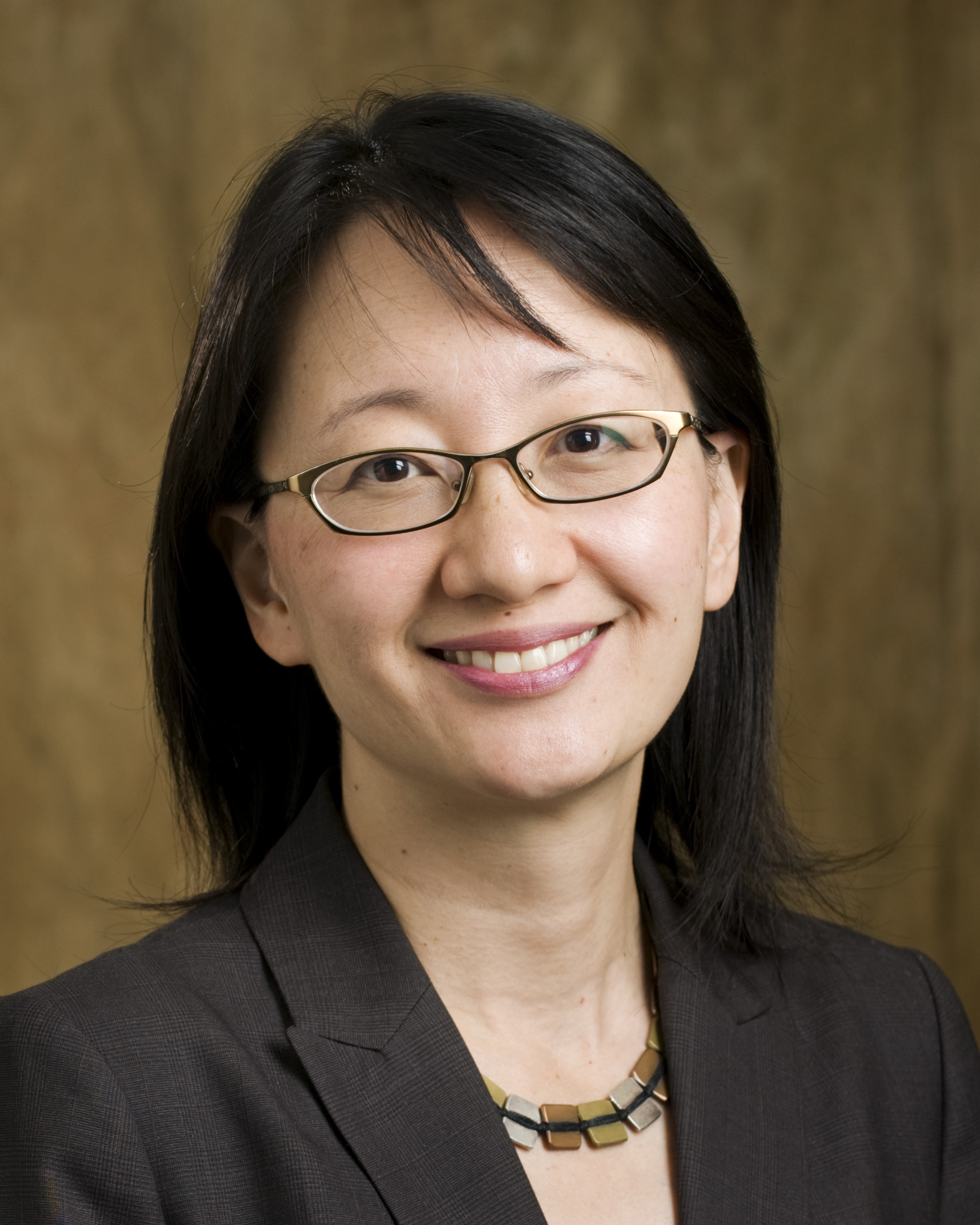
- Born: September 1966 (age 60); Morristown, New Jersey, U.S.
- Education: Harvard University (BS, MD); Balliol College, Oxford (MS, PhD); New York University (MBA)
- Awards: National Academy of Medicine
- Scientific career
- Fields: Radiology; Health administration Education; Author; Research

Vivian S. Lee (born September 1966) is an American radiologist and health care/health technology executive. An Executive Fellow at Harvard Business School and senior lecturer at Harvard Medical School and Massachusetts General Hospital, Lee is the author of the book, The Long Fix: Solving America's Health Care Crisis with Strategies That Work for Everyone (W.W. Norton, 2020). Lee is also a senior fellow at the Institute for Healthcare Improvement (IHI) in Cambridge, Massachusetts. In 2019, she was named No. 11 in Modern Healthcare's 100 Most Influential People in Healthcare and is a frequent speaker at national and international meetings on the applications of big data, AI, and technology in healthcare, leadership and managing change, health equity, and on climate change and health system resilience.

Raised in Norman, Oklahoma, and trained in biomedical engineering and medicine, Lee established an NIH-funded research program in magnetic resonance imaging at NYU. She was elected Fellow of the International Society of Magnetic Resonance in Medicine (ISMRM) in 2006 and served as the president in 2008–2009. For her scientific discoveries, she was elected to the American Society of Clinical Investigation and the National Academy of Medicine.

From 2018-2022, she was founding President of Health Platforms at Verily (Alphabet), launching and growing a number of successful health technology companies. Among her leadership roles in academic medicine, Lee served as the CEO of University of Utah Health, dean of the University of Utah School of Medicine and senior vice-president for health sciences of the University of Utah in Salt Lake City. And before that as the inaugural chief scientific officer and vice dean for science at NYU Langone Medical Center. She is also a member of the scientific advisory boards of the Massachusetts General Hospital, and previously served on the University of Pennsylvania's Center for Health Incentives & Behavioral Economics (CHIBE) external advisory board, and on the Defense Health Board of the Department of Defense. She serves as editor-at-large for The New England Journal of Medicine Catalyst.

Lee has studied the management and improvement of health care, with an emphasis on data measurement and feedback to create learning health systems and her work has demonstrated the virtuous cycle of improved patient-centeredness, higher quality with better outcomes, and lower costs.

She is married to international legal scholar Benedict Kingsbury. Lee also serves on the board of directors of the American Association of Rhodes Scholars and the Commonwealth Fund, and is also a director of Zions Bancorporation.

== Education and training ==
A U.S. Presidential Scholar and National Merit Scholar, Lee graduated from Norman High School, in Norman, Oklahoma, in 1983. In 1984 she was a Fleming Scholar in the Sir Alexander Fleming Scholarship Program for student researchers at the Oklahoma Medical Research Foundation, Oklahoma City, OK.

Lee graduated from Radcliffe College of Harvard University magna cum laude in 1986 before receiving a Rhodes Scholarship to study at Balliol College, Oxford where she received a doctorate in medical engineering. She then earned an M.D. with honors from Harvard Medical School and subsequently completed a residency in diagnostic radiology at Duke University and a fellowship in MRI at NYU Medical Center.

In 2006, she completed a Master of Business Administration degree at NYU's Stern School of Business, graduating as valedictorian. She later delivered the commencement speech for the class of 2017.

== Research in MRI ==
Funded initially while an MRI fellow and subsequently by the NIH, Lee's initial work developed methods to measure kidney glomerular filtration rate (GFR) and perfusion, noninvasively using ultra-low dose gadolinium-contrast enhanced MRI. These techniques were applied to the improved diagnosis of renovascular disease, renal transplant dysfunction, and renal function in cirrhosis. Extensions of this work include the use of MR methods to measure tissue hypoxia and tubular function.

While a part of the NYU MRI research team, Lee contributed to multiple advances in clinical body MRI, including pioneering 3D (volumetric) liver imaging for routine clinical care and for improved detection of hepatocellular carcinoma, improved methods for assessing vascular disease with 3D gadolinium-enhanced MR angiography and venography, and improved surgical planning for living related transplant donor planning in liver and kidney transplantation.

As the director of Cardiothoracic MR imaging at NYU, Lee developed new MR methods for fast cardiac imaging and for improved detection of myocardial infarcts. Subsequently, Lee's NIH funded research focused on the development of non-contrast-enhanced methods for vascular MR imaging, and functional calf muscle studies that assess exercise-induced "stress-rest" performance in patients with suspected peripheral vascular disease.

A popular lecturer who has received multiple teaching awards, Lee authored a textbook entitled Cardiovascular MRI: Physical Principles to Practical Protocols (Lippincott 2006).

== Administrative and leadership roles ==
=== NYU Langone Medical Center ===
During her 5-year tenure as vice-chair for research in radiology, Lee helped build a research administrative infrastructure that enabled the department, previously unranked in NIH research funding, to reach the top 20. During that time, NYU Langone was also the first U.S. site to install a whole-body 7-tesla MRI scanner.

In 2007, Lee became the inaugural vice dean for science, chief scientific officer and senior vice-president, serving as a member of NYU's executive leadership team. Initiatives as chief scientific officer included establishing a new philanthropically-funded Neurosciences Institute and a new NIH-funded Center for Translational Science Institute (CTSI), upgrading core facilities, educational initiatives in grantsmanship, and establishment of a new Center for Health Informatics and Bioinformatics and a new department of statistics and epidemiology. During her four-year tenure, NYU's ranking among NIH-funded schools of medicine increased from No. 36 to No. 26, and continued to rise thereafter.

=== International Society for Magnetic Resonance in Medicine (ISMRM) ===
While at NYU, Lee held a number of leadership positions in the ISMRM, the preeminent professional organization of clinical and research MR scientists. She served on the board of trustees from 2002 to 2010, president 2008–2009, and as Scientific Program Chair for 2005 Annual ISMRM meeting. During her tenure, the ISMRM increased financial reserves, enhanced clinician membership and supported sustainability efforts through new "virtual" meetings.

=== University of Utah ===
From 2011 to 2017, Lee served as senior vice-president for health sciences, dean of the school of medicine, and the CEO of University of Utah Health. Lee was responsible for an academic health sciences complex that includes five major schools (School of Medicine, School of Dentistry, and Colleges of Nursing, Pharmacy and Health) and a health care system comprising four hospitals, dozens of clinical and research specialty centers, a network of 12 Salt Lake City-area health centers, a regional affiliate network of 19 partner facilities, a health plan, and over 1,400 board-certified physicians. Under her leadership, the University of Utah established a new School of Dentistry, the first new academic dental school in the nation in over 25 years, graduating its first class in 2017.

Lee led University of Utah Health to recognition for its health care delivery system innovations that enable higher quality at lower costs and with higher patient satisfaction, as well as successful strategies of faculty development and mentorship. In 2012, the University of Utah become the first health system in the country to post patient reviews online.

In 2016, University of Utah was ranked first among university hospitals in quality and safety, with NYU Langone and Mayo Clinic rounding out the top three. That year marked the 7th consecutive year that the University of Utah was ranked in the top 10 in quality in the nation. The university's health insurance plan acquired a commercial license, grew five-fold, and was successful in the individual exchange. Improved financial performance of the clinical enterprise enabled increased support and growth of education, research, and community service initiatives.

As dean, Lee led the significant expansion of the school of medicine class size from 82 to 125 students per year with increased ongoing state funding. A number of significant philanthropic commitments were made during her tenure, including the establishment of a new Rehabilitation Hospital, funding for a number of research initiatives including the Utah Genome Project, the Center for Medical Innovation, and Driving Out Diabetes: A Larry H. Miller Family Foundation Wellness Initiative, as well as both private and state funding for a new School of Medicine building. During her tenure, the University of Utah's health sciences budget grew 50 percent to over $3.5 billion.

==== Huntsman Cancer Institute controversy ====
Lee became embroiled in a public controversy when University leadership fired Huntsman Cancer Institute CEO, Mary Beckerle, on April 17, 2017. Lee and university leadership were publicly criticized for the move by HCI's founder and prime benefactor, billionaire philanthropist Jon Huntsman, Sr. The decision prompted public protests by University of Utah faculty and staff, including an online petition calling for University leadership to reverse the decision and reinstate Beckerle. Jon Huntsman, Sr., publicly called for Lee and University President David W. Pershing to be fired from their leadership positions on April 21, 2017, questioning their ethics and predicting that the governor and state legislature would become involved to ensure their removal. On April 22, 2017, the Editorial Board of the Salt Lake Tribune (a newspaper owned by a member of the Huntsman family) called for Lee's removal as the "only remedy in this case." The University Board of Trustees met with Pershing and Lee on April 25, 2017. Within hours after the meeting, Pershing released a written statement announcing that Beckerle was immediately resuming her service as CEO and Director of Huntsman Cancer Institute and would report directly to the President of the University. Pershing's announcement signaled that Lee would no longer oversee the Huntsman Cancer Institute, raising questions about the future direction of the University Health system.

Huntsman stated that a planned donation of $250M dollars would have been withheld unless the university's decision was reversed and Beckerle reinstated. On 28 April, Lee announced via email that, effective the same day, she was stepping down as the university's senior vice president for health sciences, dean of the medical school, and CEO of the healthcare system.

After her resignation, local reporters at the Deseret News discovered more details about the dispute over finances with Huntsman Cancer Institute, including demands for substantial increases in financial transfers from the University to the Huntsman Cancer Institute.

=== Verily Health Platforms ===
From 2018 to 2022, Lee served as President of Health Platforms at Verily, an Alphabet company. As the founding leader of health platforms, she helped to launch and grow several new successful businesses in areas of digital health, precision risk insurance, healthcare analytics, mental and behavioral health, and pandemic management, with substantial year-over-year growth during her tenure. She announced her departure at the end of 2022 to move to Harvard University to focus on the intersection of tech, climate change and health care, with the aim of building more resilient systems for the future.

== Awards and recognition ==
In her academic career Lee was awarded a Rhodes Scholarship to study at Balliol College, Oxford, and was recognized as one of Crain's "40 Under 40." In 2009, she received the Chang-Lin Tien Leadership award. She was elected to the American Society of Clinical Investigation in 2015 and to the National Academy of Medicine in October 2015. In 2019 she received the gold medal, the highest award from the International Society for Magnetic Resonance in Medicine. Modern Healthcare listed her among the 100 Most Influential People in Healthcare, ranking her at No. 11.
