= HGGC =

American investment firm

HGGC, LLC
- Type: Private
- Industry: Private equity
- Founded: 2007; 19 years ago
- Headquarters: Palo Alto, California
- Key people: Rich Lawson, Steve Young, Harv Barenz, Les Brown, David Chung, Bill Conrad, Steve Leistner, Lance Taylor, and Neil White
- Total assets: $6.8 billion
- Website: www.hggc.com

HGGC, LLC, is an American middle-market private equity firm based in Palo Alto, California, with over $7 billion of cumulative capital commitments. Since its inception in 2007, HGGC has completed transactions with an aggregate transaction value of $50 billion. The firm was named 2014 M&A Mid-Market Private Equity Firm of the Year by Mergers & Acquisitions magazine.

HGGC is led by private equity executive Rich Lawson, who is CEO, NFL Hall of Fame quarterback Steve Young, Harv Barenz, Les Brown, David Chung, Bill Conrad, Steve Leistner, Lance Taylor and Neil White.

== History ==
HGGC was originally co-founded as H&G Capital Partners by Messrs. Benson, Lawson and Young alongside Jon M. Huntsman and Robert C. Gay. Prior to co-founding H&G Capital Partners, Huntsman founded Huntsman Chemical Corporation, the largest manufacturer of polystyrene in the United States. Gay was a long-time Bain Capital managing director, who gained additional prominence due to his connection to Bain Capital alumnus and presidential candidate Mitt Romney.

Shortly after launching as H&G Capital Partners, the firm was sued in 2008 by H.I.G. Capital, which argued that the H&G name would cause confusion with H.I.G. in the marketplace. H&G Capital Partners agreed to change its name to Huntsman Gay Global Capital in recognition of two of its most senior founding partners.

Gay, who had served as CEO of Huntsman Gay Global Capital since inception, accepted a calling in March 2012 to serve full-time as a general authority of the Church of Jesus Christ of Latter-day Saints. Following Gay's departure, Gary Crittenden assumed the role of CEO at Huntsman Gay Global Capital. A year later, in 2013, Huntsman Gay Global Capital rebranded itself once again to the simpler HGGC, along with making some top management changes. Lawson became CEO, taking over from Crittenden, who became chairman.

In August 2021, it was reported that the company had a minority stake in the hair extension product company Beauty Industry Group (BIG). In November 2021, it was reported that HGGC had purchased a majority stake in Grand Fitness Partners, a franchisee with 42 Planet Fitness clubs. Also in November 2021, it was reported that HGGC and investment firm Snapdragon Capital Partners invested $240 million in online supplement dispensary firm Fullscript. As of July 2022, the company's portfolio also included automotive industry data-mining company AutoAlert, vitamin and supplement business Better Being, and property-management software firm Entrata.

== Investment strategy ==
HGGC makes leveraged buyout, recapitalization and growth equity investments in middle market companies. HGGC looks to invest in companies involved in updating end markets that use outdated technology, including grocery stores, car dealerships, marketing agencies and insurance providers.

Technology, in and of itself, is invading every end market, and it is driving companies to be more competitive than their peers," says Rich Lawson, CEO of HGGC. "What's changed is the proliferation of a computer in everyone's pocket. There's a much more sophisticated end-user base, and that is driving change in how businesses will have to compete."

"We're looking for business people using technology to disrupt or drive change in their respective industries," says Les Brown, Managing Director and COO of HGGC.

HGGC invests across a range of industry sectors, including tech and tech-enabled services, business services, financial services, consumer and industrials. HGGC's investing focus is typically on middle-market companies that have $100 million to $1 billion in annual revenues. HGGC primarily focuses on North American investments, although not exclusively.

== Funds and investments ==
=== Fund I ($1.1 billion) ===
HGGC's debut fund (Fund I) held a first close in March 2008 and a final close in March 2009. Fund I received $1.1 billion of investor commitments, ahead of its original $1 billion target. In May 2008, CalPERS made a $180 million commitment to this initial private equity fund.

=== Fund II ($1.3 billion) ===
HGGC's second fund (Fund II) held a first close in March 2014 and a final close in March 2015. Fund II received $1.3 billion of investor commitments, surpassing a $1 billion target and reaching a $1.25 billion voluntary hard cap, which excluded the firm's GP commitment of $80 million. Notable investors in HGGC Fund II include PKA-AIP of Copenhagen, Denmark, which committed $125 million and OPTrust of Toronto, Canada. Other investors in Fund II include Swedish public pension AP Fonden 3, Pennsylvania Public School Employees' Retirement System (PSERS), British public pension West Yorkshire Pension Fund, Belgian investment firm Brederode SA and French insurer CNP Assurances.

=== Fund III ($1.8 billion) ===
HGGC's third flagship fund (Fund III) launched on September 6, 2016, and held a final close on December 14, 2016, which represented only 99 days in market. Fund III received $1.84 billion of investor commitments, surpassing a $1.5 billion target and reaching a $1.75 billion voluntary hard cap, which excluded the firm's GP commitment of approximately $85 million.

=== Fund IV ($2.54 billion) ===
HGGC's fourth fund (Fund IV) closed in June 2022 at $2.54 billion, after being targeted at $2.25 billion.

=== Investments ===
Early Fund II investment transactions include AutoAlert, which provides cloud-based data and analytics services to the automotive market; Pearl Holding Group, an insurance-services company; Serena Software, an information technology business, which sold to Micro Focus International Plc (LSE: MCRO.L) for $540 million; and Survey Sampling International, which provides data and technology services for consumer and business-to-business research.

Representative Fund I investments include MyWebGrocer; Citadel Plastics Holdings, which sold to A. Schulman (NASDAQ: SHLM) for $800 million; Hollander Sleep Products, which sold to Sentinel Capital Partners; hybris, an e-commerce business that was sold to SAP for over $1 billion; and Sunquest Information Systems, which sold to Roper Industries (NYSE: ROP) for $1.415 billion.

== Trademark dispute ==
H&G Capital Partners logo prior to the 2008 rebranding

Huntsman Gay Global Capital logo after the 2008 rebranding

After naming the firm H&G Capital Partners, Miami-based private equity firm H.I.G. Capital sent a letter to H&G Capital Partners in March 2008 demanding that the firm change its name. H.I.G., which also makes private equity investments in middle market companies in the United States, claimed that the similarity of the two names would cause confusion in the market. H.I.G. subsequently sued H&G Capital Partners, hoping to prevent H&G Capital Partners from using the name. Previously, H.I.G. had been at the receiving end of similar litigation in Europe. In 2007, HgCapital, a European private equity firm had launched a trademark infringement lawsuit against H.I.G. Capital after it intensified its efforts in Europe.

H&G Capital Partners eventually renamed itself Huntsman Gay Global Capital, which it later changed to HGGC.
