= Howard W. Hunter Law Library =

Coordinates: 40°14′59″N 111°38′43″W

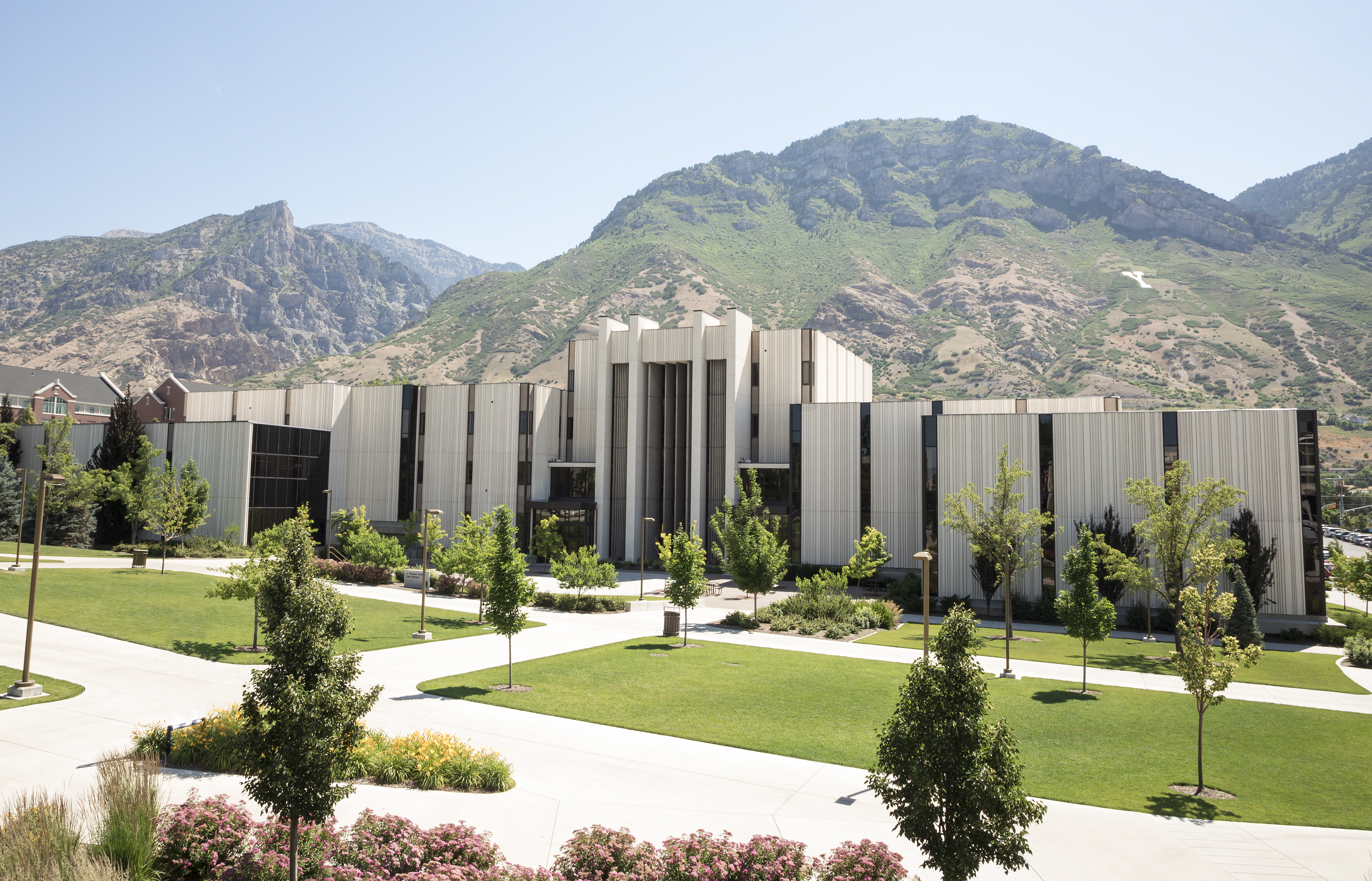
The BYU Law Library occupies the left side of the law school building.

The Howard W. Hunter Law Library (BYU Law Library) is the library of the J. Reuben Clark Law School at Brigham Young University (BYU) in Provo, Utah.

It was named for Howard W. Hunter, the 14th President of the Church of Jesus Christ of Latter-day Saints, who had been a lawyer in the Los Angeles area before he was called as a member of the Quorum of the Twelve.

== History ==
The library opened in 1975 and was renamed at the time of its expansion in 1995--shortly after Hunter's death. Hunter had been an early advocate for the founding of the BYU law school as a member of the BYU Board of Trustees and had also been closely connected with recruiting Rex E. Lee to be the first dean. The Howard W. Hunter Professorship was established in 1989 at the law school to support faculty research, writing, and scholarship.

The library was expanded in large part due to a $5.5 million donation from Jon M. Huntsman, Sr. who had been Hunter's stake president and a good friend. The library underwent renovations from May 1995 to November 1996 and added 60,000-square-feet of space to the 40,000-square-foot library.

In 2010, the BYU Law Library was ranked the 25th best law library in the country by National Jurist magazine. As of 2010, BYU had 507,614 volumes, 212,952 titles, 38 students per librarian, and 1.98 library seats per person--the highest ratio among the top 50 libraries in the study.

As of 2025, the current Law Library Director is Shawn G. Nevers, who has held this position since 2023 when he replaced Kory Staheli.

== Features ==
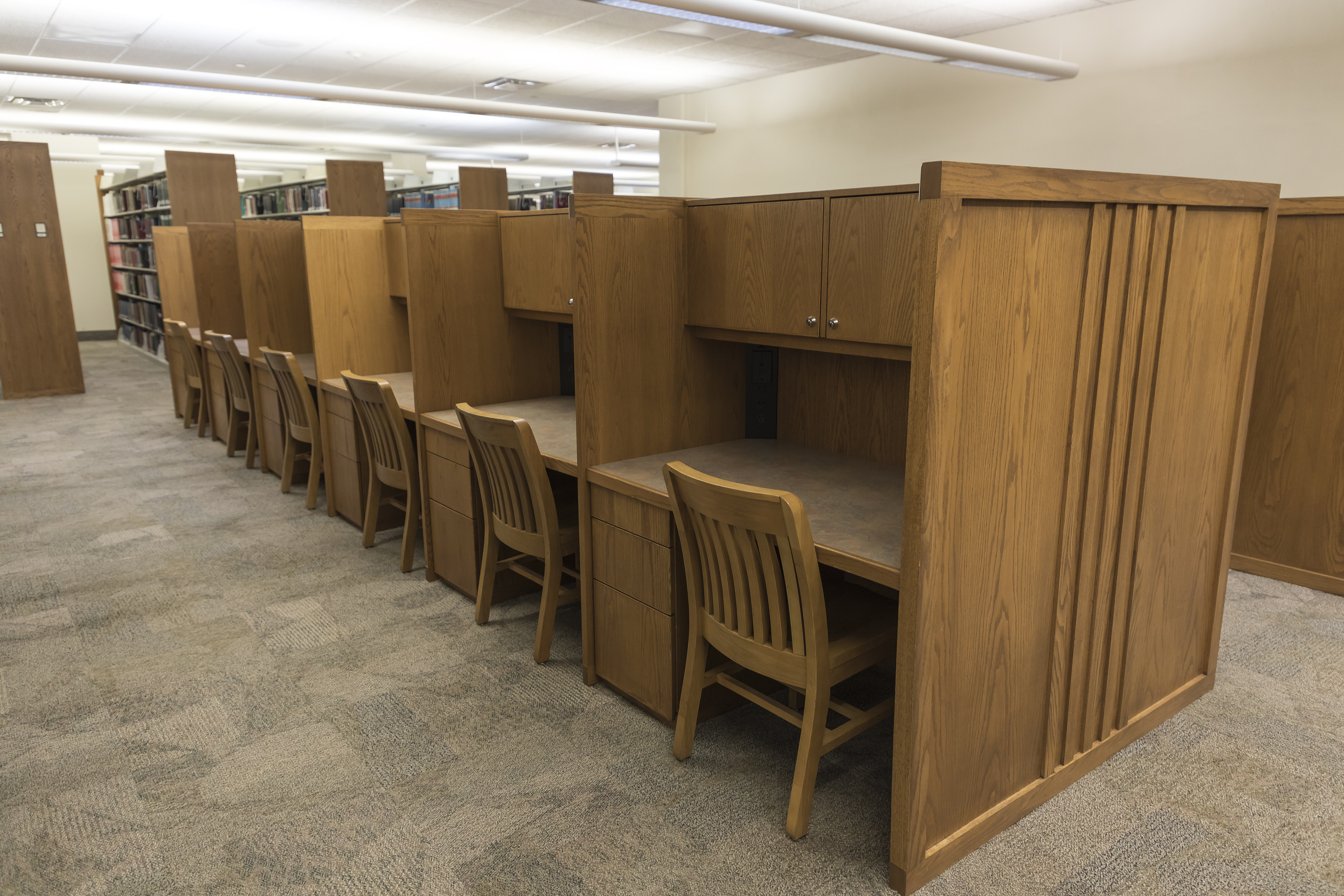
Several of the hundreds of carrels found in the law library

The law library provides a carrel to every law student in good standing. First-year students are randomly assigned a carrel, while second and third-year students get to select their carrels. There are over 400 carrels in the law library, mainly on the first and third floors.

The library is located in the same building as the Clark Law School, but it has clear internal entrances which are the security points beyond which books that have not been checked out may not go. Although geared towards the needs of law school students, any BYU student may check out materials from the law library. Additionally, any patron may access a version of Westlaw through the library's system.
