= Huntsman Cancer Institute =

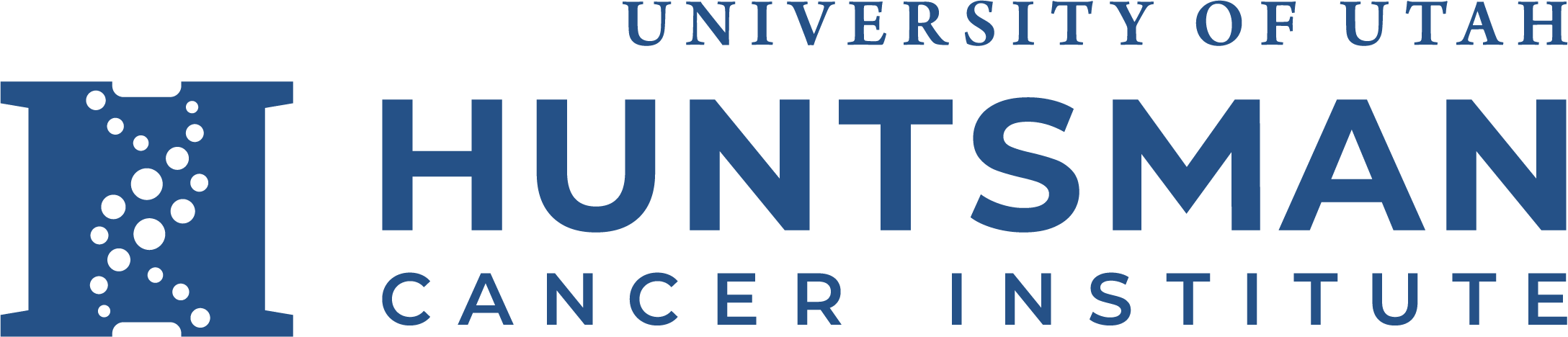

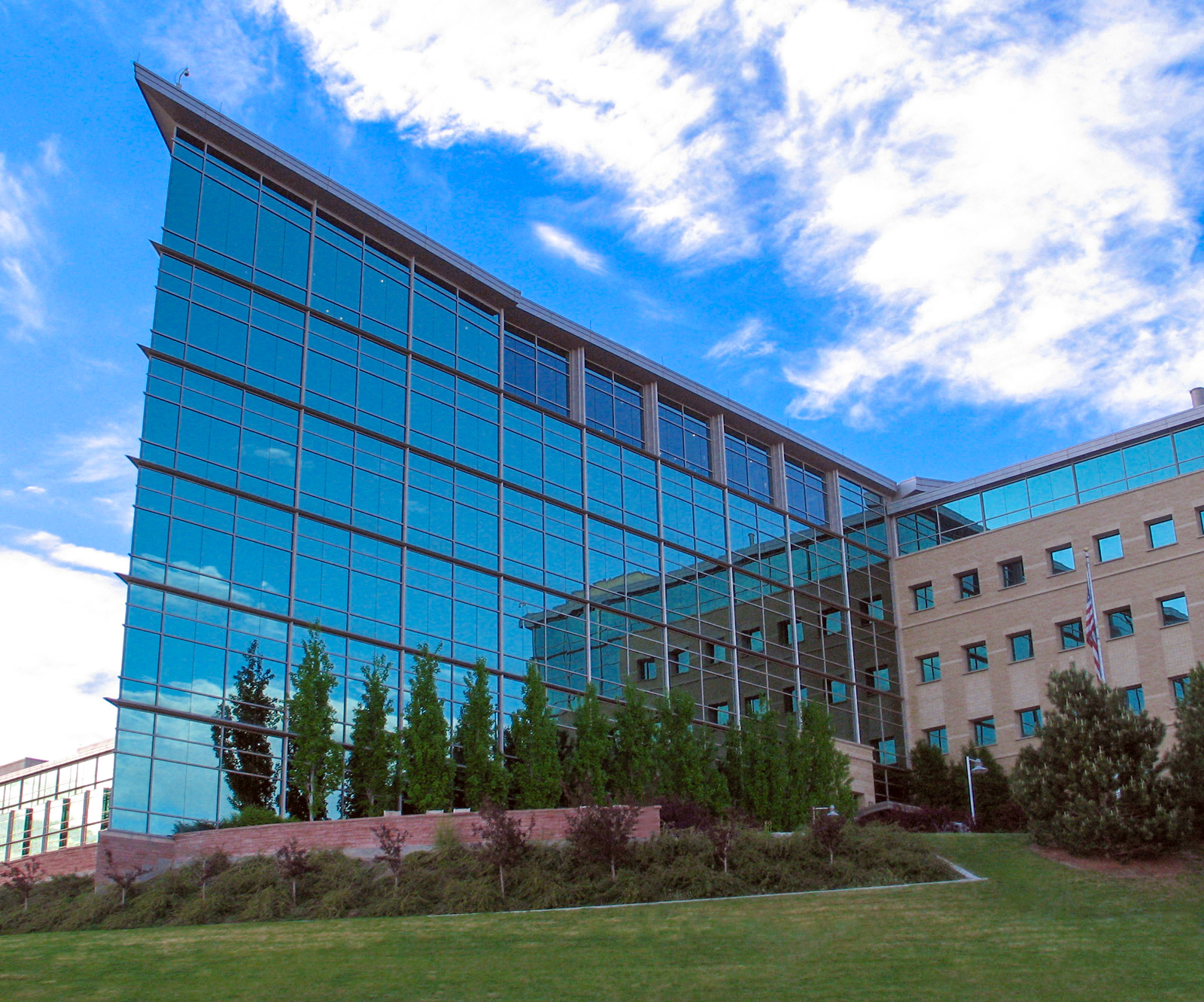

Geography
- Location: Salt Lake City, Utah, United States
- Coordinates: 40.7725°N 111.8345°W

Organization
- Care system: Public
- Type: Teaching
- Affiliated university: University of Utah

Links
- Website: http://www.huntsmancancer.org/ Official
- Lists: Hospitals in Utah

Huntsman Cancer Institute (HCI) is an NCI-designated cancer research facility and hospital located on the campus of the University of Utah in Salt Lake City, Utah. It is the only National Cancer Institute-designated Comprehensive Cancer Center in the Intermountain West.

== Overview ==
Huntsman Cancer Institute opened in 1999 and was founded with a pledge of $100 million of personal wealth from Jon Huntsman Sr., a philanthropist and businessman. To date, Huntsman has donated more than $250 million of his own money since Huntsman Cancer Institute was established. Mary Beckerle served as Huntsman Cancer Institute's chief executive officer and director from 2006 to 2025. On September 1, 2025 Bradley Cairns, PhD, started as CEO.

In November 2013, Huntsman donated an additional $50 million for the construction of a new research building dedicated to researching children's cancer and cancers that run in families. The Primary Children's and Families' Research Center opened in 2017. In addition, Jon Huntsman and the Huntsman Cancer Foundation committed to donating $120 million to HCI.

In 2015, the National Cancer Institute awarded HCI Comprehensive Cancer Center status.

== Research ==
Scientists at the institute aim to understand cancer at a molecular and genetic level and strive to find new and more effective ways to treat this disease. A treatment approach based on genetic knowledge allows for more targeted, individualized cancer therapies.

=== Research programs ===
The center's research is supported by a Cancer Center Support Grant from the National Cancer Institute, which subsidizes cancer research performed by more than 130 members of the Cancer Center.

== Sponsored Content controversy ==
In 2017, the Sinclair Broadcasting Group was fined 13.3 million US-$ by the FCC for not properly designating paid advertising content by the Huntsman Cancer Institute as such. The advertisements, either in the form of 60- or 90-second shorts or half-hour standalone programs, were shown over 1700 times in SBG-affiliated broadcasts. In a statement, Sinclair denounced the fine, which at that point was the largest ever imposed by the FCC, as "unreasonable".
