= Huntsman Corporation =

Multinational chemical company

- Type: Public
- Traded as: NYSE: HUN; Russell 1000 component
- Industry: Chemicals
- Founded: 1970; 56 years ago
- Founder: Jon Huntsman Sr.
- Headquarters: The Woodlands, Texas, U.S.
- Key people: Peter R. Huntsman (Chairman, President, and CEO)
- Revenue: ▼US$5.683 billion (2025)
- Net income: ▼ −US$284 million (2025)
- Number of employees: 7,000 (2023)
- Website: huntsman.com

Huntsman Corporation is an American multinational manufacturer and marketer of chemical products for consumers and industrial customers. Huntsman manufactures assorted polyurethanes, performance products, and adhesives for customers like BMW, GE, Chevron, Procter & Gamble, Unilever and Walkaroo. With global headquarters in The Woodlands, Texas, it operates more than 60 manufacturing, R&D and operations facilities in over 25 countries and employ approximately 7,000 associates across three business divisions. Huntsman Corporation had 2023 revenues of approximately $6 billion.

== History ==
The Huntsman Corporation was founded as the Huntsman Container Corporation in 1970 by Alonzo Blaine Huntsman Jr. and his younger brother Jon Huntsman, Sr. It went public as the Huntsman Corporation on the New York Stock Exchange NYSE: HUN in February 2005. Huntsman has grown through a series of acquisitions (with some divestitures) and today is a manufacturer and marketer of differentiated and specialty chemical products.

In April 1994, Huntsman acquired the Texaco Chemical company for $1.1 billion. Texaco Inc. agreed to sell its last remaining petrochemicals plant to Huntsman in 1999 for about $600 million.

The Huntsman Corporation became the then third-largest petrochemical business in the United States when in 1999, it acquired Imperial Chemical Industries' polyurethanes, titanium dioxide, aromatics and petrochemical global businesses for $2.8 billion.

Huntsman also acquired the Performance Additives and Titanium Dioxide (TiO_{2}) businesses of Rockwood Holdings, Inc. on October 1, 2014, to become the largest color and white pigments company in the world. Huntsman paid approximately $1 billion in cash and assumed certain unfunded European pension liabilities.

=== Huntsman Building Solutions Created ===
Huntsman named its spray polyurethane foam (SPF) business as Huntsman Building Solutions (HBS) in May, 2020. The SPF business was formed when Huntsman acquired leading North American SPF company Icynene-Lapolla in February 2020 and combined it with Demilec, which Huntsman acquired in 2018. Huntsman is now the fifth largest insulation manufacturer in the world.

=== Proposed merger with Clariant ===
In May 2017, Huntsman and Clariant announced that they would merge, as equals, forming a global leader in specialty chemicals with the deal valued at $20 billion. Clariant shareholders would own 52% of the new entity, with Huntsman shareholders owning the remaining 48% of shares.

The merger agreement was terminated on October 27, 2017.

=== IPO of Venator ===
Huntsman Corporation spun-off its Pigments and Additives division as Venator Materials in an initial public offering on August 8, 2017.

Venator became the owner of Huntsman's Titanium Dioxide and Performance Additives businesses, which offers products comprising a broad range of pigments and additives that add performance and color to many everyday items.

On May 14, 2023, Venator filed for Chapter 11 bankruptcy.

=== Terminated takeover and Apollo suit ===
In June 2007, it was announced that Huntsman had agreed to be acquired by Access Industries, owned by the billionaire Len Blavatnik, for $5.88 billion in cash. Huntsman shareholders would receive $25.25 a share from Access Industries' chemical unit, Basell Holdings, based in Hoofddorp, Netherlands. Access would assume $3.7bn of Huntsman debt.

However, on July 12, 2007, the agreement was terminated as Huntsman agreed to be bought by Apollo Global Management for $6.51bn. Huntsman filed a suit in Texas against Apollo and two partners, co-founders Leon Black and Josh Harris, after the group backed out of the deal to purchase the company in June 2008. The suit alleged fraud against Apollo Management as Huntsman believed that the group never intended to allow its Hexion Specialty Chemicals unit to buy Huntsman Corp. for $6.5 billion. Huntsman also claimed Apollo put forth a higher bid to prevent the Basell AF buyout as it would have threatened Hexion's market share. Hexion stated Huntsman's declining financial position as the reason the deal was terminated. Upon termination of the Hexion merger agreement, the Huntsman stock value dropped by almost 50%.

In December 2008, Apollo and Hexion agreed to pay Huntsman $1.1 billion in return for Huntsman dropping all charges against them. This includes $500 million in cash, a $250 million investment in Huntsman, and an additional $425 million in cash, repayable by separate suits against Credit Suisse.

=== Starboard stake ===
Activist hedge fund Starboard disclosed a stake in the company in 2021. The hedge fund owned more than 8% of Huntsman, roughly $500 million worth. Starboard did not succeed in gaining seats on the company's board, one of its goals, and decided to completely exit their position within Huntsman.

== Business segments ==
Advanced Materials supplies synthetic and formulated polymer systems. Huntsman’s epoxy, acrylic and polyurethane-based polymer products are used to replace traditional materials in aircraft, automobiles and electrical power transmission. Epoxy-based adhesives are also sold in the B2C segment primarily in India, Brazil & some parts of Europe under the brand name Araldite. The roots date back to 1758, when J.R. Geigy Ltd., the oldest chemicals company in Basel, Switzerland, began trading in chemicals and dyes. Huntsman acquired the Advanced Materials business from Vantico back in 2003.

Polyurethanes supplies MDI-based polyurethane precursors and systems used in an extensive range of applications and market sectors.

Performance Products supplies amines, carbonates, surfactants, and maleic anhydride. End uses include agrochemicals; oil, gas, and alternative energy; home detergents and personal care products; adhesives and coatings; mining; and curing agents for polyurethane and epoxy.

== Controversy ==
During the 2022 Russian invasion of Ukraine, Huntsman Corporation refused to withdraw from the Russian market. Research led by Jeffrey Sonnenfeld from Yale University updated on April 28, 2022 identifying how companies were reacting to Russia's invasion, identified Huntsman in their worst category of "Digging In", or refusing to withdraw or limit activities in Russia.

Peter Huntsman of Huntsman Corporation responded to the Yale list by condemning the Russian invasion of Ukraine. Additionally, he further noted the company was in full compliance with all American and EU laws; asserted none of their products had military applications; and stated hundreds of Russian and Ukrainian workers depended on the company to support their families. Peter Huntsman also objected to the implication staff at Yale University have the right to dictate policy and operations for American companies.
