= IQor =

American customer service company

- Type: Privately-held
- Industry: Business process outsourcing
- Headquarters: 6700 N. Andrews Ave. Ste. 600, Fort Lauderdale, Florida 33309, United States
- Key people: Chris Crowley - President and CEO
- Products: Customer Care, Revenue Generation, Technical Support, Customer Retention
- Brands: iQor
- Services: Third-party collections, Accounts receivable management, and Customer Service
- Owner: Privately owned by Mill Point Capital
- Number of employees: 40,000
- Website: iqor.com

iQor is a privately held business process outsourcing company headquartered in Fort Lauderdale, Florida. It specializes in customer care, revenue generation, technical support, and accounts receivable management.

== History ==
After becoming CEO and President of iQor in January 2004, Vikas Kapoor built the company's computing platforms, developer tools, and cloud computing services. Its employee base grew from 4,000 to 14,000, leading InformationWeek to rank iQor #27 among the top technology innovators in the United States.

In September 2020, iQor filed for Chapter 11 bankruptcy protection with plans to eliminate $513 million in long-term debt and sell its assets to lenders. It emerged from bankruptcy two months later.

In 2024, iQor was acquired by Mill Point Capital (MPC). It is currently a privately held firm owned by MPC and the iQor management team.

== Investigations ==
In 2012, a CBC news investigation found that iQor routinely and sometimes knowingly repeatedly contacted people who did not owe debt in Canada. The investigation noted that in 2012, two Canadian provinces had fined iQor for violating provincial regulations. In 2010, Allied Interstate, a subsidiary of iQor, was fined $1.75 million by the Federal Trade Commission for harassing debtors and trying to collect from the wrong people.
