= Taylor R. Randall =

American educator and academic administrator

Taylor Randall
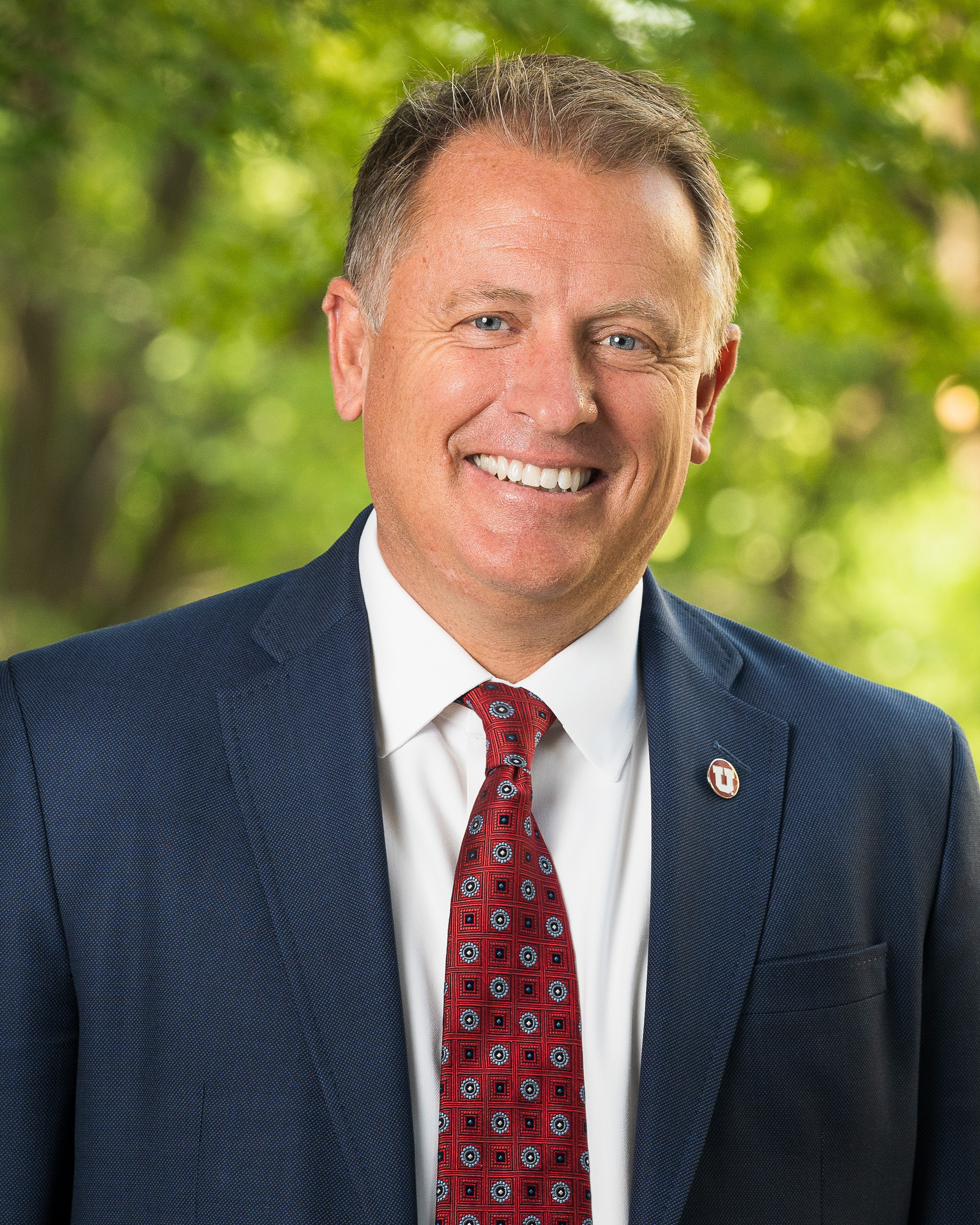
- Randall in 2021

17th President of University of Utah
- Incumbent
- Assumed office September 2021
- Preceded by: Michael L. Good (acting)

Personal details
- Born: Berkeley, California, U.S.
- Education: University of Utah (BS); University of Pennsylvania (MBA, MA, PhD)

Academic background
- Thesis: Product variety, supply chain structure, and firm performance: Analysis of the bicycle industry (1999)
- Doctoral advisor: Christopher Ittner

Academic work
- Discipline: Business administration
- Institutions: University of Utah

Taylor Reed Randall is an American educator and academic administrator. Since September 2021, he has served as the 17th President of the University of Utah. Prior to his appointment as president, he was dean of the David Eccles School of Business (2009–2021).

== Early life and education ==
Randall was born in Berkeley, California, and later raised in Salt Lake City, Utah, where he attended Olympus High School. He graduated from the University of Utah with honors in accounting and then went on to earn an M.B.A., a master's degree in managerial economics, and a Ph.D. in operations and information management from the Wharton School of Business at the University of Pennsylvania. He is a third-generation business professor. His father, Reed Randall, was a professor and director of the school of accounting, and his grandfather, Clyde Randall, was Dean of the School of Business from 1958 to 1968.

== Career ==
In 1998, Randall joined the David Eccles School of Business as a professor of accounting. In May 2009, Randall was appointed the dean of David Eccles School of Business. During his tenure as a dean, the school opened the Marriner S. Eccles Institute for Economics and Quantitative Analysis, the Kem C. Gardner Policy Institute, the Sorenson Impact Center, and the Goff Strategic Leadership Center.

Since 2016, Randall has been actively engaged in AACSB, serving on numerous continuous improvement review site visits, and on the AACSB Continuous Improvement Review Committee. In 2017, Randall was elected as the president of the Southwest Dean’s Association.

In early 2020, Randall was selected by the Governor of Utah to join the Utah Health & Economic Recovery task-force with the objective of stopping the spread of COVID-19 and re-engaging the State of Utah's social and economic activity.

On August 5, 2021, Randall was selected as the 17th president of the University of Utah.

In addition to his work in the classroom and the President’s office, Randall has served as visiting faculty at Wharton, Washington University, and INSEAD.

== Personal life ==
Randall and his wife, Janet, have four children and currently reside in Salt Lake City, Utah.

== Research ==
- Randall, T., & Harry Groenevelt, Nils Rudi. (2009). End-of-Period vs. Continuous Accounting of Inventory-Related Costs. Operations Research. Discipline based - refereed, Published, 12/2009.http://or.journal.informs.org/cgi/content/abstract/57/6/1360
- Randall, T., & Gerard Cachon, Glen Schmidt. (2007). In Search of the Bullwhip Effect. Manufacturing and Service Operations Management. Discipline based - refereed, Published, 09/2007.
- Randall, T., & Christian Terweisch, Karl Ulrich. (2007). User Design of Customized Products. Marketing Science. Discipline based - refereed, Published, 03/2007.
- Randall, T., & Serguei Netessine, Nils Rudi. (2006). An Empirical Examination of the Decision to Invest in Fulfillment Capabilities: A Study of Internet Retailers. Management Science. Discipline based - refereed, Published, 2006.
- Randall, T., & Susan Kulp, Gregg Brandyberry, Kevin Potts. (2006). Internal Control Systems and Incentives: The Next Phase of Procurement Efficiency. Interfaces. Discipline based - refereed, Published, 05/2006.
- Randall, T., & Christian Terweisch, Karl Ulrich. (2005). Principles for User Design of Customized Products. California Management Review. Practice - refereed, Published, 2005.
- Randall, T., & Susan Chesteen, Berit Helgheim, Don Wardell. (2005). Comparing quality of care in for profit and non-profit nursing homes: a process perspective. Journal of Operations Management. Discipline based - refereed, Published, 2005.
- Randall, T., & Ruskin Morgan and Alysse Morton. (2004). Efficient versus Responsive Supply Chain Choice: An Empirical Investigation. Journal of Product Innovation Management. Published, 2004.
- Randall, T., & Christopher Ittner and David Larcker. (2004). Performance Implications of Strategic Performance Measurement in Financial Services Firms. Accounting Organizations and Society. Published, 2004.
- Randall, T., & Christopher Ittner, David Larcker. (2003). Performance Implications of Strategic Performance Measurement in Financial Services Firms. Accounting Organizations and Society. Discipline based - refereed, Published, 10/2003.
- Randall, T., & Nils Rudi and Serguei Netessine. (2002). Should you take the Virtual Path. Supply Chain Management Review. Published, 11/2002.
- Randall, T., & Karl Ulrich. (2001). Product Variety, Supply Chain Structure, and Firm Performance: An Empirical Examination of the U.S. Bicycle Industry. Management Science. Published, 12/2001.
- Randall, T., & David Reibstein and Karl Ulrich. (1998). Brand Equity and Line Extension: How Low Can You Go?. (pp. 7 thru 8). Financial Times, Part Four of Mastering Marketing. Published, 10/1998.
- Randall, T., & with Karl Ulrich, Marshall Fisher, and David Reibstein. (1998). Managing Product Variety: A Study of the Bicycle Industry. Managing Product Variety. Published, 1998.
- Randall, T., & Christopher Ittner and David Larcker. (1997). The Activity Based Cost Hierarchy, Production Policies and Firm Profitability. Journal of Management Accounting Research. Published, 1997.
