= Mary Beckerle =

American cell biologist

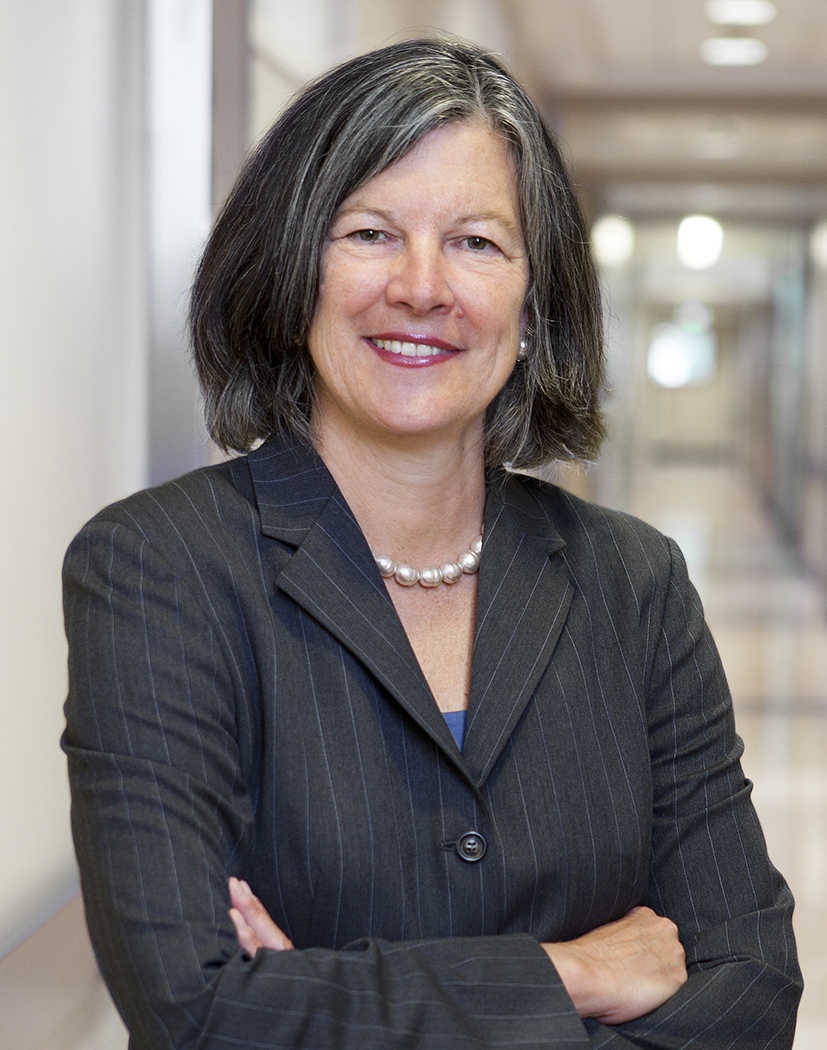
Mary Beckerle in 2012

Mary C. Beckerle is an American cell biologist who studies cancer at the Huntsman Cancer Institute at the University of Utah School of Medicine. At Huntsman Cancer Institute, she is the CEO, and is Associate Vice President for Cancer Affairs at the University of Utah. Beckerle's research helped to define a novel molecular pathway for cell motility, and more recently, she has begun research into Ewing's sarcoma, a pediatric bone cancer. Beckerle's lab made a ground breaking discovery in regards to Ewing's Sarcoma in relation to the EWS/FLI protein. Her lab discovered EWS/FLI to disrupt the internal cellular skeleton, which decreases the ability of cells to adhere to their proper environment. This can help explain the metastasis of tumors in patients with Ewing's sarcoma.

== Early life ==
Mary Catherine Beckerle was born in Rivers Edge, New Jersey to Martin and Mickey Beckerle. She is the oldest of three daughters. Her father worked at the New York Telephone Co. and died at the age of 36 of emphysema. Her mother was a registered nurse. After high school, Beckerle attended Wells College in New York, where she earned a B. A. in Biology and Psychology. She graduated magna cum laude and was a member of Phi Beta Kappa. Before continuing her education, she took a year off and worked in a cellular biology research laboratory at University of Texas Southwest Medical Center. After this, she attended the University of Colorado Boulder where she earned a PhD. in Molecular Biology. Her education then continued at the University of North Carolina Chapel Hill where she was a postdoctoral fellow in Anatomy and Cell Biology.

== Personal life ==
While at the University of North Carolina Chapel Hill, Beckerle met David Murrell. She would go on to marry him. The couple shares one son.

== Career ==
Beckerle joined the University of Utah faculty as an assistant professor of biology. She continued at the University of Utah and was one of the first professors to move into the Huntsman Cancer Institute when it opened in 1999. Also in 1999, she was awarded the Ralph E. and Willa T. Main Presidential Endowed Chair in Cancer Research at the University of Utah. She led a program specializing in cancer cell biology until 2003. In 2003, she was named the deputy director of the center. In 2006, she was named the CEO and the director of Huntsman Cancer Institute. In 2009, she was also named the Associate Vice President for Cancer Affairs at the University of Utah. She holds the Jon M. Huntsman Presidential Endowed Chair at the University of Utah, where she has also been promoted to a distinguished professorship in the biology department.

In 1990, Beckerle was on the editorial board of Molecular Biology of the cell. She was awarded a Guggenheim Fellowship in Molecular and Cellular Biology at the Curie Institute in Paris in 1999. In 2006, Beckerle was the president of the American Society of Cell Biology. She was elected to the American Academy of Arts and Sciences in 2008. In 2013, she was elected to the Board of Directors of the American Association for Cancer Research. Beckerle was elected to the American Philosophical Society in the April 2017 group of inductees that also included Barack Obama. She was on the Life Sciences jury for the Infosys Prize in 2020.

She is a member of the U. S. National Academy of Sciences.

=== 2017 Huntsman Cancer Institute firing and reinstatement ===
On 17 April 2017, Beckerle was terminated as CEO and Director of the Huntsman Cancer Institute via an email from University of Utah President David W. Pershing and Senior Vice President for Health Sciences Vivian Lee. The university did not disclose reasons for the dismissal, but members of the Huntsman family issued several public criticisms of the move, and called for Beckerle's reinstatement while criticizing the leadership shown by Pershing and Lee. In subsequent days, members of the family made media appearances, published full page newspaper ads reiterating their support for cancer research and Beckerle, and even called for the termination of top university officials. Beckerle's firing occurred as the University of Utah and Huntsman Cancer Foundation were negotiating terms for a new memorandum of understanding to govern the operations of Huntsman Cancer Institute. Some Huntsman Cancer Institute faculty and staff were among over 3600 individuals who signed a petition requesting Beckerle be restored to her position. On 19 April, roughly 100 demonstrators marched from the Huntsman Cancer Institute facilities across the university campus to the Office of President Pershing, calling for Beckerle's return. This came on the heels of other meetings and protests in the university community. On the morning of 25 April, the university's board of trustees met in a closed session, after which Pershing briefly spoke to reporters, mentioning that an announcement would be forthcoming later in the day. Within a few hours, it was announced that Beckerle would be reinstated as CEO and Director of the Huntsman Cancer Institute, and would report directly to the University President, bypassing Vivian Lee. On 28 April, Vivian Lee announced via email that, effective the same day, she was stepping down as the university's senior vice president for health sciences, dean of the medical school, and CEO of the healthcare system.

== Research and Ewing's Sarcoma ==
Beckerle's research employs several different techniques to exam signaling problems and cell motility issues. Ewing's Sarcoma is a bone cancer affecting mainly children and adolescents. Tumors of Ewing' Sarcoma are typically found in the long bones of the legs and arms, or bones in the chest, trunk, pelvis, back, or head. Beckerle's research in this area focuses on a key pathway as believed to be a mechanism by which the cancer cells can spread. Ewing sarcoma occurs due to a chromosomal mutation that causes an atypical protein, known as EWS/FLI, to be present (also called expressed), and that when EWS/FLI is expressed, literally thousands of genes are misregulated, leading to abnormal behavior. Beckerle's lab found that the EWS/FLI protein disrupted cell adhesion and limited the ability of cells to remain in their normal environment. The EWS/FLI protein is difficult to regulate so Beckerle's team is focused on an essential regulating protein called lysine specific demethylase (LSD1). Preliminary research has aimed to halt the function of LSD1 to prevent the spread of Ewing Sarcoma cells.

== Selected publications ==
- Beckerle, MC (2010). "How cell biologists can contribute to improving cancer outcomes". Mol Biol Cell. 21 (22): 3788–9. doi:10.1091/mbc.e10-05-0423. PMC 2982089. PMID 21079011.
- Pronovost, SM; Beckerle, MC; Kadrmas, JL (2013). "Elevated expression of the integrin-associated protein PINCH suppresses the defects of Drosophila melanogaster muscle hypercontraction mutants". PLOS Genet. 9 (3) e1003406. doi:10.1371/journal.pgen.1003406. PMC 3610608. PMID 23555310.
- Chapin, LM; Blankman, E; Smith, MA; Shiu, YT; Beckerle, MC (2012). "Lateral communication between stress fiber sarcomeres facilitates a local remodeling response". Biophys. J. 103 (10): 2082–92. Bibcode:2012BpJ...103.2082C. doi:10.1016/j.bpj.2012.09.038. PMC 3512046. PMID 23200042.
- Elias, MC; Pronovost, SM; Cahill, KJ; Beckerle, MC; Kadrmas, JL (2012). "A crucial role for Ras suppressor-1 (RSU-1) revealed when PINCH and ILK binding is disrupted". J Cell Sci. 125 (Pt 13): 3185–94. doi:10.1242/jcs.101386. PMC 3434853. PMID 22467865.
- Hoffman, LM; Jensen, CC; Chaturvedi, A; Yoshigi, M; Beckerle, MC (2012). "Stretch-induced actin remodeling requires targeting of zyxin to stress fibers and recruitment of actin regulators". Mol Biol Cell. 23 (10): 1846–59. doi:10.1091/mbc.e11-12-1057. PMC 3350550. PMID 22456508. S2CID 19368851.
- Chaturvedi, A; Hoffman, LM; Welm, AL; Lessnick, SL; Beckerle, MC (2012). "The EWS/FLI Oncogene Drives Changes in Cellular Morphology, Adhesion, and Migration in Ewing Sarcoma". Genes Cancer. 3 (2): 102–16. doi:10.1177/1947601912457024. PMC 3463921. PMID 23050043.
- Smith, MA; Blankman, E; Deakin, NO; Hoffman, LM; Jensen, CC; Turner, CE; Beckerle, MC (2013). "LIM domains target actin regulators paxillin and zyxin to sites of stress fiber strain". PLOS ONE. 8 (8) e69378. Bibcode:2013PLoSO...869378S. doi:10.1371/journal.pone.0069378. PMC 3749209. PMID 23990882. S2CID 18689737.
