= Jon Huntsman Sr. =

American businessman and philanthropist (1937–2018)

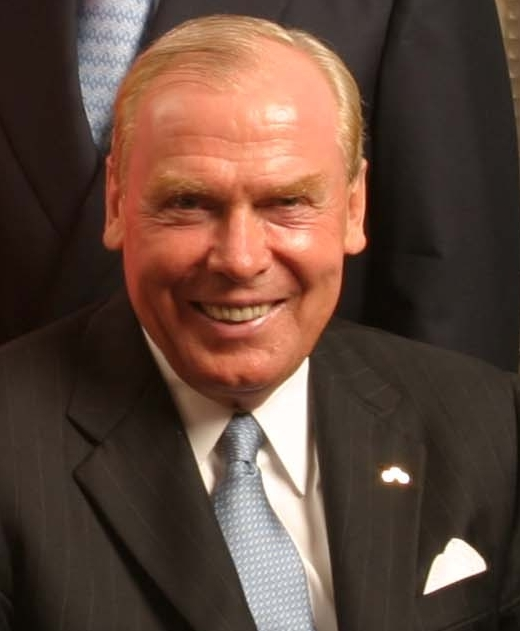
- Huntsman in 2004

White House Staff Secretary
- In office February 22, 1971 – January 1, 1972
- President: Richard Nixon
- Preceded by: John Brown
- Succeeded by: Bruce A. Kehrli

Personal details
- Born: Jon Meade Huntsman; June 21, 1937 Blackfoot, Idaho, U.S.
- Died: February 2, 2018 (aged 80) Salt Lake City, Utah, U.S.
- Party: Republican
- Spouse: Karen Haight
- Children: 9, including Jon and Peter
- Education: University of Pennsylvania (BS); University of Southern California (MBA)
- Awards: Othmer Gold Medal (2004); Bower Award (2015); Carnegie Medal of Philanthropy (2015)

Jon Meade Huntsman Sr. (June 21, 1937 – February 2, 2018) was an American businessman and philanthropist. He was the founder and executive chairman of Huntsman Corporation, a global manufacturer and marketer of specialty chemicals. Huntsman plastics are used in a wide variety of familiar objects, including (formerly) clamshell containers for McDonald's hamburgers. Huntsman Corporation also manufactures a wide variety of organic and inorganic chemicals that include polyurethanes, textiles, and pigments. Huntsman's philanthropic giving exceeded $1.5 billion, focusing on areas of cancer research, programs at various universities, and aid to Armenia.

== Early life and education ==
Jon Meade Huntsman was born in Blackfoot, Idaho. His mother Sarah was a homemaker, and his father Alonzo was a teacher. In 1950, the family moved to Palo Alto, California, where Alonzo pursued graduate studies at Stanford University, earning an M.A. and Ed.D. He then became a superintendent of schools in the Los Altos district.

Jon Huntsman attended Palo Alto High School, where he became student body president. He was recruited by Harold Zellerbach, chairman of Crown-Zellerbach Paper Company, to attend the Wharton School of the University of Pennsylvania on a Zellerbach scholarship. He graduated from Wharton in the spring of 1959, a brother of the Sigma Chi fraternity.

Huntsman married Karen Haight, daughter of David B. Haight, in June 1959, just weeks after he graduated. Both were members of the Church of Jesus Christ of Latter-day Saints (LDS Church). In July 1959, Huntsman left to serve for two years in the U.S. Navy as an officer aboard the USS Calvert. He subsequently earned an MBA from the University of Southern California's Marshall School of Business in 1966.

== Business career ==
=== Dolco Packaging Corporation ===
In 1961, Huntsman was employed by Olson Brothers, Inc., an egg-producing company in Los Angeles. There, he advanced through the ranks to assume the role of vice president of operations. Recognizing that the company sustained substantial losses due to poor packaging, Huntsman became interested in developing a better alternative. His leadership was key in developing the first plastic egg carton. In 1965, he established contact with the polystyrene operations of the Dow Chemical Company. In 1967, he became president of a joint venture between Olson Brothers, Inc., and Dow Chemical, the Dolco Packaging Corporation.

=== Huntsman Container Corporation ===
Seeing an opportunity to create packaging for the emerging fast-food industry, Huntsman left Dolco in 1970 to form the Huntsman Container Corporation with his brother and others in Fullerton, California. Plants were constructed in Fullerton, California, in 1971 and in Troy, Ohio, in 1972. Since cash flow was an issue for the new company, Huntsman mortgaged his house and borrowed heavily from banks. In 1973 the company nearly collapsed when an Arab oil embargo cut off supplies of polystyrene, used to make expandable/expanded polystyrene (or EPS).

In 1974, Huntsman Container Corporation created the "clamshell" container for McDonald's Big Mac. The company also developed other popular products, including the first plastic plates, bowls, and fast-food containers. In 1976, after completion of its first international plant at Skelmersdale, England, a stock deal was arranged to sell Huntsman Container Corporation to Keyes Fiber Company. Huntsman continued to serve as CEO of the container business for four more years and held a directorship of Keyes Fiber Company.

=== Huntsman Chemical Company – Huntsman Corporation ===
In 1982, after serving as a mission president for the LDS Church in Washington, DC, for three years, Huntsman continued his plastics and petrochemical pursuits with the formation of a new company, Huntsman Chemical Company, in Salt Lake City, Utah. In his capacity as CEO and Chairman, he grew the business into a multibillion-dollar company, in part by acquiring a number of businesses in the polystyrene, styrene, and polypropylene industry when they were not seen as profitable. Between 1986 and 2000 Huntsman acquired 36 companies, 35 of which turned out to be hugely profitable.

In 1994, the Huntsman Chemical Company was renamed the Huntsman Corporation. In 1996, Peter R. Huntsman became President and COO of Huntsman Corporation. In 2000 he replaced his father as the company's CEO. Jon M. Huntsman continued to be involved in the company as Chairman.

During the 2000s, Huntsman continued its pattern of expansion, both in America and around the world, and reorganization. Huntsman Corporation became publicly traded on the New York Stock Exchange in 2005. As of 2014, Huntsman reported that it operated 80 manufacturing and R&D facilities in 30 countries and employed approximately 12,000 associates.

=== Huntsman Gay Global Capital ===
In 2007 Huntsman co-founded an additional new private equity firm, Huntsman Gay Global Capital (now known as HGGC), with two former Bain Capital executives, Robert C. Gay (1989–2004, managing director) and Greg Benson (executive vice president in London), former Sorenson Capital co-founder and managing director Rich Lawson, and Pro Football Hall of Fame quarterback Steve Young to focus on investments in middle market companies.

== Scientific awards and honors ==
Huntsman has been awarded thirteen honorary doctorate degrees at various universities. In 2004 he received the Othmer Gold Medal, awarded by the Chemical Heritage Foundation in recognition of contributions in research, innovation, legislation or philanthropy. In 2013 he received the Leadership Award for Lifetime Achievement from the Chemical Marketing and Economics (CM&E) group. In 2015, he received the Bower Award from the Franklin Institute.

== Personal life and death ==
Huntsman and his wife, Karen, were married for over 58 years and had nine children: Jon Jr., Peter, Christena, Kathleen (d. 2010), David, Paul, James, Jennifer, and Mark. At the time of Huntsman's death, they had 56 grandchildren, two of whom were adopted from China and India, and 19 great-grandchildren.

Huntsman's eldest son, Jon Jr., also served as a Huntsman Corporation executive. He was elected Governor of Utah in 2004 and was a candidate in the Republican Party presidential primaries in 2012. He has also served in other governmental positions, including as Ambassador of the United States to Singapore, China, and Russia.

Huntsman's second eldest son, Peter, took over as CEO of the Huntsman Corporation in July 2000 and as chairman in January 2018.

On December 8, 1987, Huntsman's son, James, then age 16, was kidnapped and held for $1 million ransom by Nicholas Hans Byrd, a former classmate. FBI agents traced the kidnapper and rescued James unharmed, but agent Al Jacobsen was stabbed in the chest during the arrest.

Huntsman has published a book about his life experience, communicating moral lessons. Titled Winners Never Cheat: Everyday Values We Learned as Children (But May Have Forgotten), it was published by Wharton School Publishing in 2005. A second edition, titled Winners Never Cheat: Even in Difficult Times, made the Wall Street Journal's best-sellers list.

Huntsman was a four-time cancer survivor. He died on February 2, 2018, at his home in Salt Lake City.

== Religion ==
As a member of the Latter Day Saints (LDS) Church, Huntsman served as an area seventy from 1996 to 2011. He also served as a regional representative, stake president, and as president of the church's Washington, D.C. Mission from 1980 to 1983.

== Politics ==
In 1977 he was chairman of the Western States Republican Leaders. He was also the Republican Party of Utah national committeeman from 1976 to 1980. He was a friend of conservative radio talk show host Glenn Beck and has been interviewed on his show. He was more socially conservative than his son, Jon Huntsman Jr. He was close friends with both Glenn Beck on the right and Harry Reid on the left, who both helped further the mission of Huntsman Cancer Institute.

=== Nixon administration ===
While the Huntsman Container Corporation's first packaging plant was being built in 1970, Huntsman joined the Nixon Administration as Associate Administrator of the Department of Health, Education and Welfare and later served as Special Assistant and Staff Secretary to President Nixon. Upon completion of the second Huntsman Container site in Troy, Ohio, in 1972, Huntsman left the White House staff to become President and CEO of Huntsman Container, while still serving – in a non-paid position – as a consultant to the Office of the President.

=== Presidential elections ===
He served as chairman for Utah in Ronald Reagan's presidential campaign in 1984 and George H. W. Bush's campaigns in 1988 and 1992.

=== 1988 Utah gubernatorial election ===
In March 1988, Huntsman announced he would run against incumbent Utah Governor Norm Bangerter in the Republican primary. Huntsman was leading in public opinion polls, sometimes by a double-digit margin. He reportedly raised almost $300,000 in campaign advertising, returning all funds raised back to the donors. A few weeks later, Huntsman went on a 10-day business trip to Asia with his friend, U.S. Senator Jake Garn, who was chairman of Governor Bangerter's campaign. In mid-April Huntsman dropped out of the gubernatorial race and endorsed the governor, saying that party unity and his business responsibilities were more important than his political career, and asking political independents to support Bangerter. Later that year, Governor Bangerter appointed Huntsman to be the first Ambassador for Economic Development for the State of Utah.

=== Son's 2012 Republican presidential campaign ===
Huntsman's son, Jon Huntsman Jr., served in the administrations of five U.S. Presidents, including Barack Obama (as U.S. Ambassador to China) and most recently Donald Trump (as Ambassador to Russia), and was a candidate for the 2012 Republican presidential nomination.

There was considerable speculation that the viability of Jon Huntsman Jr.'s campaign might depend on Jon Huntsman Sr.'s willingness to fund advertising for it, via the Superpac "Our Destiny PAC". Jon Huntsman Jr. reportedly downplayed the possibility of receiving campaign funding from his family before the New Hampshire primary election, telling NPR that "the Huntsman family gives to humanitarian causes and doesn't consider a political campaign to be a humanitarian cause". However, reports filed with the Federal Election Commission later showed that Our Destiny PAC received $2.7 million in contributions, $1.9 million of it from Huntsman Sr. Much of that money was spent on campaign ads, including $914,000 on campaign ads in New Hampshire in the two months before the January primary.

Huntsman Sr. appeared on stage with Jon Huntsman Jr. and his wife and daughters at the third-place finish celebration in Manchester, New Hampshire. Huntsman Jr. announced his intention in Manchester to continue the campaign in South Carolina but dropped out on January 16, in advance of the vote there, throwing his support to Mitt Romney.

== Philanthropy ==
Huntsman was widely recognized for his humanitarian giving which, including contributions to the homeless, the ill and the under-privileged, exceeds $1.5 billion and has assisted thousands, both domestically and internationally. The Chronicle of Philanthropy placed Jon and Karen Huntsman second on their 2007 list of largest American donors. On January 1, 2000, The Salt Lake Tribune included him among "The 10 Utahns Who Most Influenced Our State in the 20th Century" for his donations to education and medical research. In 2001 Jon and Karen Huntsman were presented with the Entrepreneur of the Year Award for Principle-Centered Leadership. In 2003 he received the Humanitarian of the Year Award, presented by Larry King of CNN. In November 2008, the American Cancer Society presented him its Medal of Honor for Cancer Philanthropy, and in 2014 he was awarded the William E. Simon Prize for Philanthropic Leadership. In 2015, he was awarded the Philanthropy Roundtable's Carnegie Medal of Philanthropy Award.

=== Cancer research ===
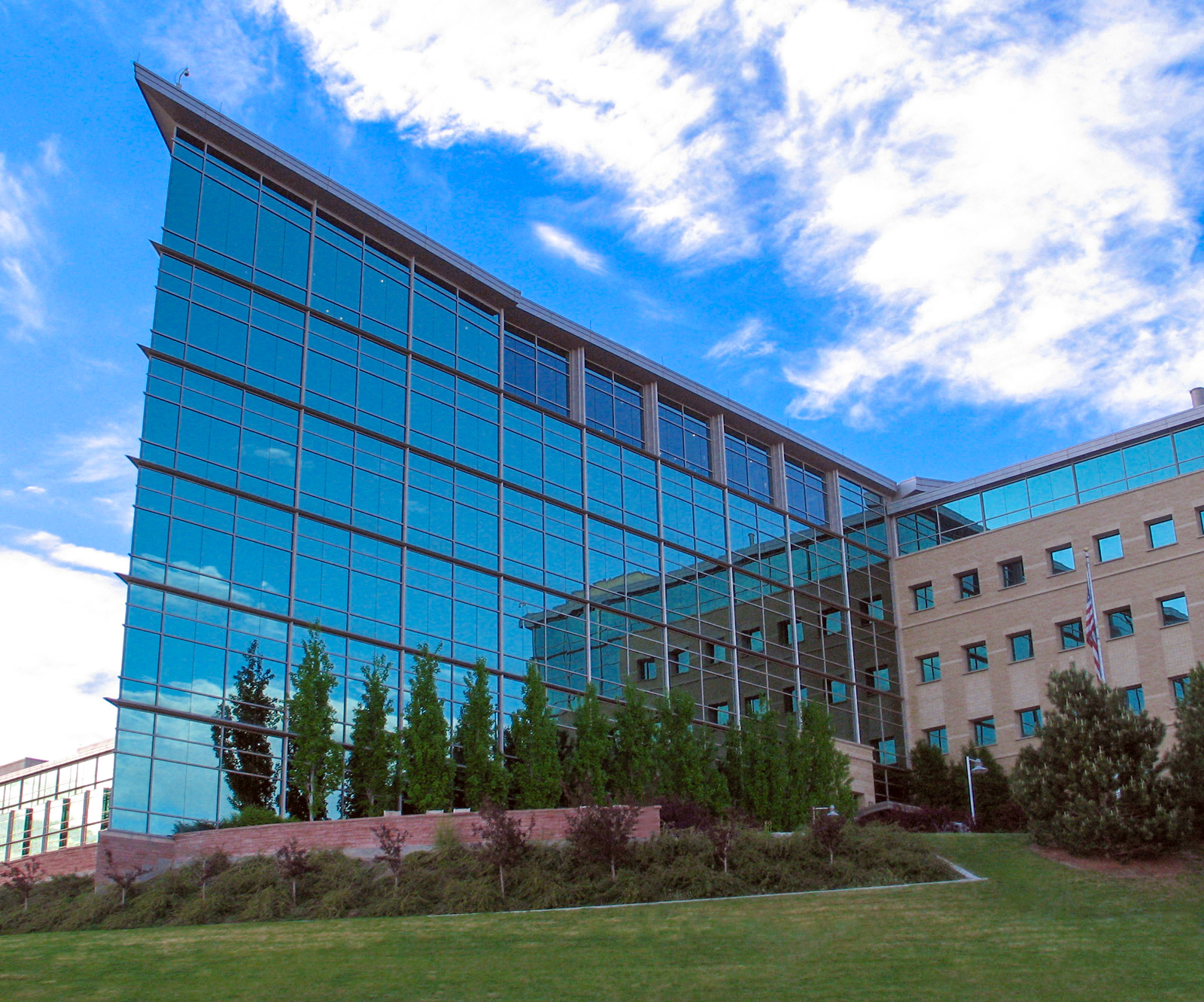
The Huntsman Cancer Institute at the University of Utah

One of Huntsman's most notable causes is the Huntsman Cancer Institute (HCI) at the University of Utah, of which he was the founder and principal benefactor. He and his wife Karen established the Huntsman Cancer Institute in 1993 with a gift of $10 million from the Huntsman family. The Huntsmans gave the institute a further $100 million in 1995, an amount roughly equal to a year's total distribution to researchers from the American Cancer Society. Their goal was to accelerate the work of curing cancer through human genetics. The institute is now one of America's major cancer research centers dedicated to finding a cure for cancer with a state-of-the-art cancer specialty hospital.

The Institute continues to receive substantial gifts from the Huntsman family. Huntsman, a cancer survivor, has stated "Except for my family and faith, there is no cause more important to me than fighting cancer ... I have committed the rest of my life to doing all I can to support clinical and research efforts to eliminate this disease." To date, the Huntsman family and close associates have donated more than $656 million in support of the mission of HCI.

In November 2013, Huntsman donated or raised $120 million to Huntsman Cancer Institute at the University of Utah for the construction of a new research building dedicated to children's cancer. The Primary Children's and Families' Cancer Research Center at Huntsman Cancer Institute was dedicated June 21, 2017, Huntsman's 80th birthday.

Huntsman also promoted support of the institute through the Sigma Chi fraternity. Sigma Chi chose the Huntsman Cancer Foundation as one of its preferred philanthropic partners in December 2012. As of April 12, 2013, Sigma Chi had raised their first one-million dollars for cancer research. By 2017, Sigma Chi's total has reached over five million dollars for cancer research.

=== Education ===
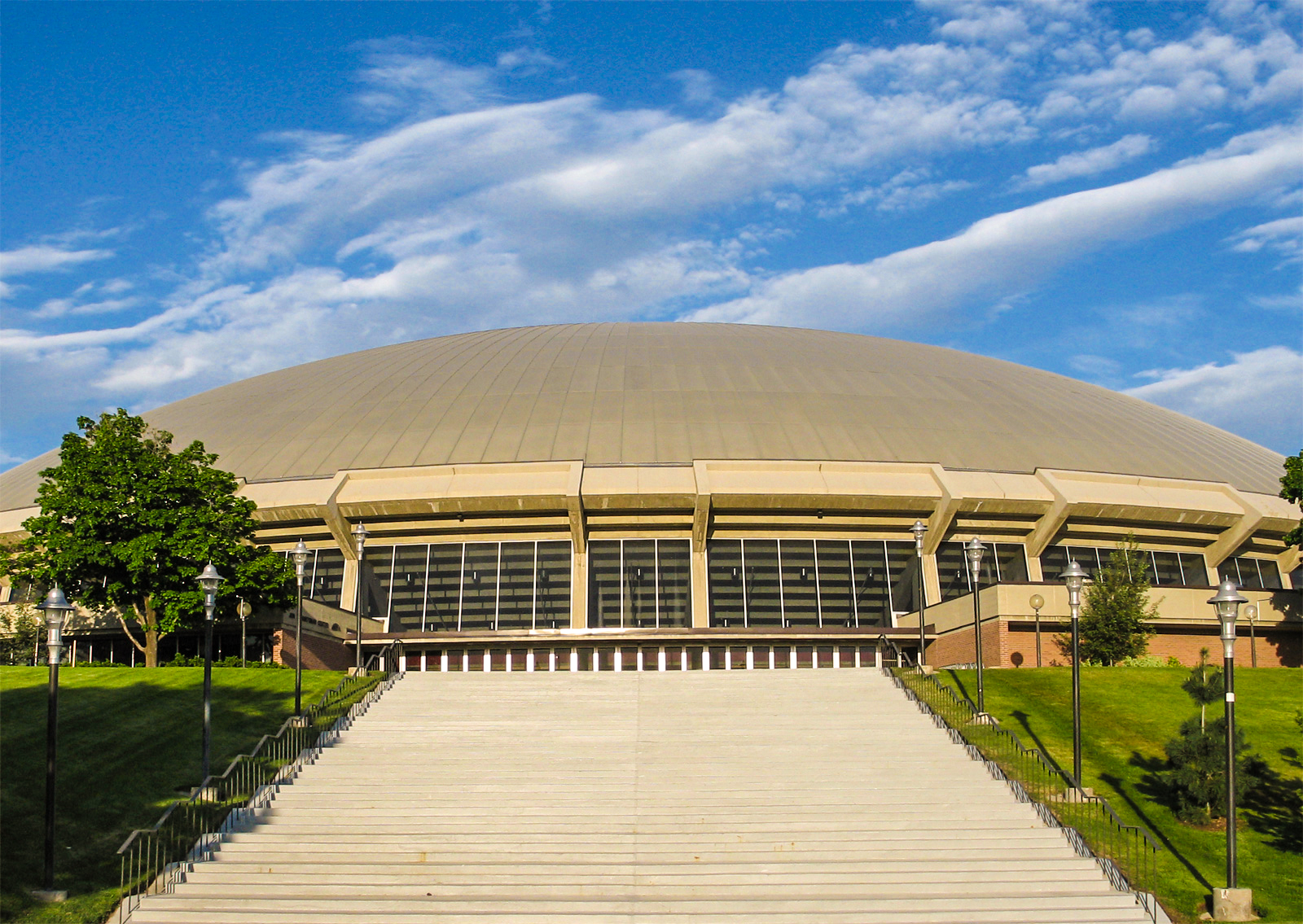
Jon M. Huntsman Center at the University of Utah in Salt Lake City

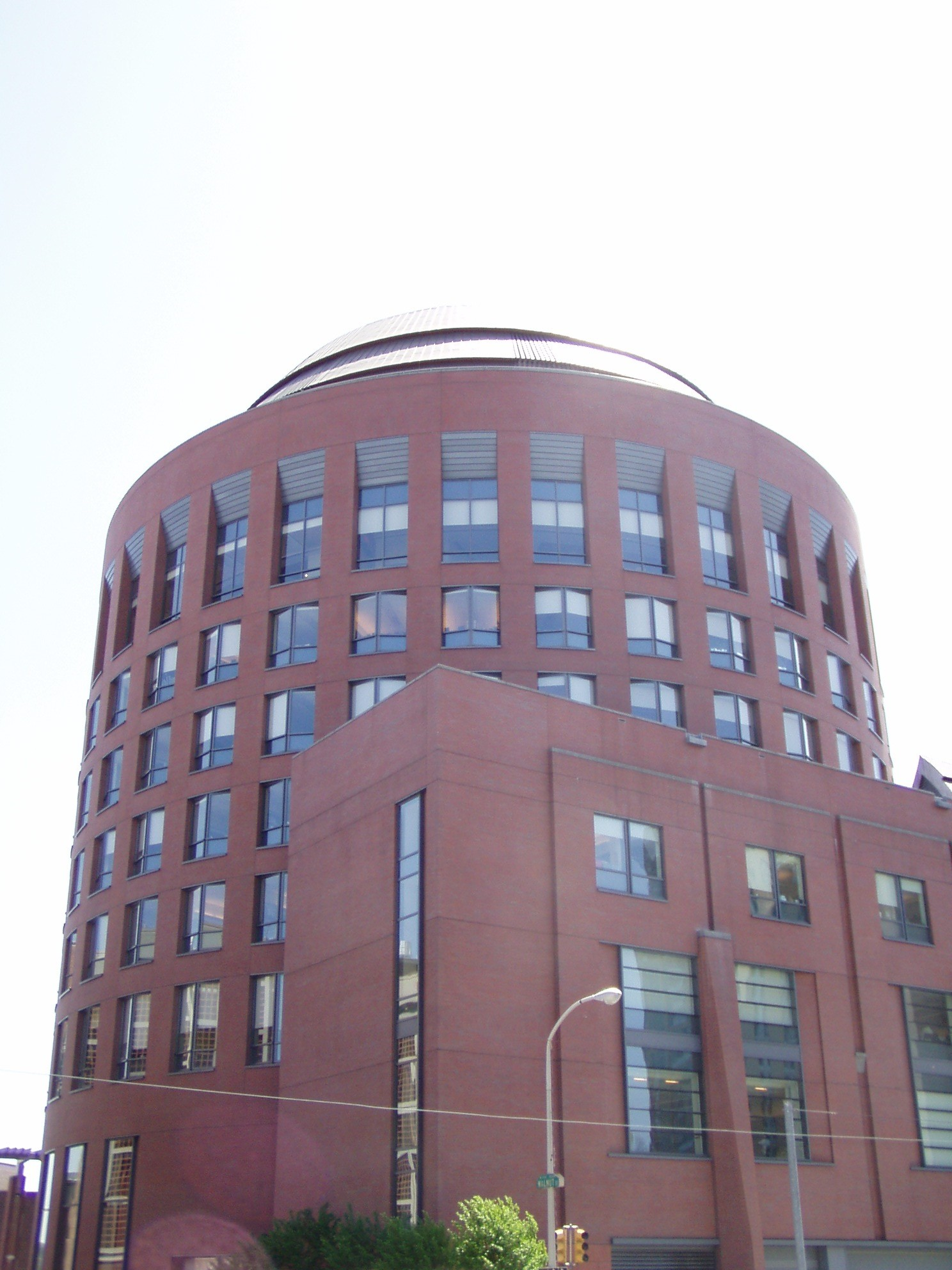
Jon M. Huntsman Hall at the Wharton School of the University of Pennsylvania

Huntsman had supported the University of Utah in Salt Lake City in other ways as well. The 15,000-seat Jon M. Huntsman Center for special events opened in 1969 and is used for gymnastics, basketball, and volleyball. It has been the site of national championships in both gymnastics and basketball, including NCAA men's basketball. As of 2013, the Huntsmans have supported the building of an additional basketball practice facility, to be named the Jon M. and Karen Huntsman Basketball Center.

Huntsman has also given support to other universities. He has served as Chairman of the Board of Overseers of his alma mater, the Wharton School of the University of Pennsylvania, in Philadelphia, Pennsylvania. One of the school's signature buildings, Jon Huntsman Hall, was named in his honor. Huntsman made an unrestricted gift of more than $50 million to Wharton, which was critical to development of the $140 million project. As of 1994, the Huntsmans also endowed the Huntsman Program in International Studies and Business at the University of Pennsylvania, a four-year undergraduate program that combines business education and liberal arts.

In 1989 Huntsman gave $1 million to Utah State University in Logan, Utah, for the Huntsman Environmental Research Center. At a press conference to announce the gift, Huntsman said the preservation of the environment is the single most important issue in the world. The Huntsmans also donated $500,000 to rebuild the Alumni Center, renamed the David B. Haight Alumni Center in honor of Mrs. Huntsman's father. In December 2007, Utah State University announced that its College of Business would be renamed the Jon M. Huntsman School of Business, in recognition of a gift from Huntsman and his wife of $26 million, a major contributor for the new $40 million school of business building referred to as Huntsman Hall—the largest in the university's history to that time. In 2017, Huntsman and Charles Koch donated another $50 million to the Huntsman School of Business for student scholarships and a new Center for Growth and Opportunity.

The law library at Brigham Young University, built in 1975, was expanded and renamed for Howard W. Hunter in 1995 with financial support from Jon and Karen Huntsman and other donors. A new library building at Southern Utah University, named in honor of retiring SUU President Gerald R. Sherratt, contains the Jon and Karen Huntsman Reading Room. The Huntsmans also contributed to the Karen H. Huntsman Library in Snow College, Utah. Completed in 2010, it is a "green" building, expected to be the first academic library in the state to achieve gold Leadership in Energy and Environmental Design certification.

=== Aid to Armenia ===
Huntsman has also contributed to efforts to rebuild in Armenia, which was devastated by an earthquake in 1988. He and other family members have made 46 trips to Armenia over 25 years. He estimates that he has given at least $50 million to relief efforts in Armenia, including money to build schools and hospitals. One of his earliest projects there involved setting up a plant to make pre-stressed concrete, to supply building materials for reconstruction and to employ Armenians. The Huntsmans have built a tile roofing plant in Yerevan, apartment complexes, and a K-12 school in the city of Gyumri. The Huntsmans also provide scholarships to bring Armenian students to America to study at Utah State University. Huntsman has been granted citizenship in the country and awarded two medals of honor by Armenia, one of them the St. Mesrop Mashtots Order.

Huntsman's donations of more than $1.2 billion overall dropped him from the "Forbes 400" list as of 2010. His wealth was not disclosed; however, he was listed as number 937 on the "Forbes World's Richest Persons" for 2010. He was one of only 19 of the world's 1,200 billionaires to have donated more than $1 billion. He has said that he wants to "die broke" by giving his money away to various charities.

Rocky Anderson, Democratic mayor of Salt Lake City, has said of Huntsman:

I was impressed with Jon from the first, when he told me he lost respect for Richard Nixon ... when he learned that Nixon had not given anything to charity one year he was president ... It was clear to me that Jon's real motivation in his work and accumulation of wealth was to give much of what he has to make people's lives better.

== Awards ==
- 1954 – Student body President, Palo Alto High School
- 1955 – Awarded the Crown Zellerbach Scholarship to The Wharton School, University of Pennsylvania
- 1959 – University of Pennsylvania Student Alumni Award of Merit (undergrad)
- 1959 – University of Pennsylvania Spoon Award (most outstanding student graduate)
- 1959 – International Balfour Award (most outstanding Sigma Chi in US/Canada)
- 1971 – José Marti Brotherhood Award, from Cuban Americans, Most Respected U.S. Citizen
- 1991 – Armenian Medal of Honor
- 1994 – American Academy of Achievement
- 1994 – Kaveler Award, Most Outstanding CEO, Chemical Industry
- 1994 - Inducted into the Plastics Hall of Fame
- 1996 – Great Humanitarian Award, Freedom Foundation
- 1996 – National Caring Award, Caring Institute
- 1997 – Horatio Alger National Award
- 1999 – Armenian Presidential Award
- 1999 – University of Pennsylvania Alumni Award of Merit
- 2000 – Named One of Ten Most Influential Utahns in the 20th Century
- 2001 – Entrepreneur of the Year, Ernst & Young
- 2003 – Humanitarian of the Year
- 2004 – Othmer Award, Outstanding Inventions in Plastics, Chemical Heritage Foundation
- 2005 – Giant in our City Award, Salt Lake Chamber of Commerce
- 2006 – American Red Cross Excellence in Governance Award
- 2008 – Medal of Honor, American Cancer Society
- 2008 – Trustee Emeritus, University of Pennsylvania
- 2009 – Chairman Emeritus, The Wharton School Board of Overseers (University of Pennsylvania)
- 2010 – Distinguished Public Service Award, American Assn. for Cancer Research
- 2010 – Inducted into Idaho's Hall of Fame
- 2010 – National Award for Charity (Restoring Honor Day, Washington, D.C.)
- 2011 – Service Above Self Award
- 2011 – WSJ's Innovator of the Year Award
- 2013 – Leadership Award for Lifetime Achievement, American Chemical Society
- 2014 – William E. Simon Award for Philanthropy
- 2015 – The Franklin Institute of Philadelphia's Business Leadership Award (Bower Award)
- 2015 – Philanthropy Roundtable's Carnegie Medal of Philanthropy Award
- 2016 – Insider Magazine listed Huntsman as second largest contributor to charities in America; Fortune Magazine names Huntsman as 2nd most generous man in America.

== Controversy ==
Huntsman contributed to the resignation of the CEO of University of Utah Healthcare (HCI), Vivian Lee, after threatening to withhold $250 million in donations to the Huntsman Cancer Institute and attacking Lee's character in the public sphere. Lee resigned after the public backlash she received, particularly from editorials printed in the Salt Lake Tribune, a newspaper owned by the Huntsman family.

In an editorial, Huntsman described Lee as attempting a "power-grab", while Huntsman was attempting to sever HCI and University of Utah ties. This controversy has raised the question of how much private donors should have a say in publicly funded healthcare.
