= Michael K. Young =

American academic administrator

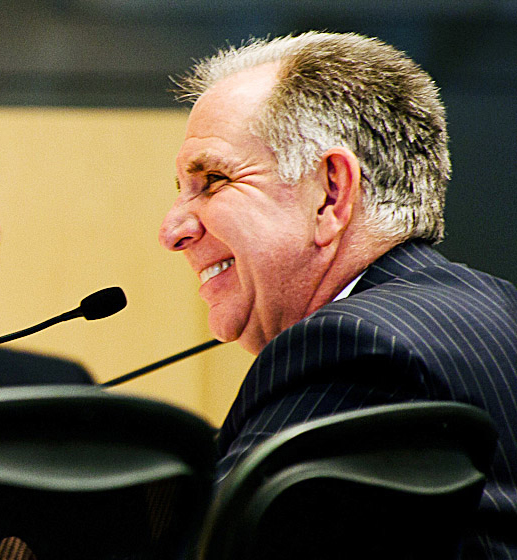
- Young in 2011

25th President of Texas A&M University
- In office May 1, 2015 – December 31, 2020
- Preceded by: Mark A. Hussey (Interim)
- Succeeded by: John L. Junkins (Interim)

31st President of the University of Washington
- In office July 2011 – April 2015
- Preceded by: Mark Emmert
- Succeeded by: Ana Mari Cauce

14th President of the University of Utah
- In office August 2004 – May 2011
- Preceded by: Bernie Machen
- Succeeded by: David W. Pershing

Personal details
- Born: Michael Kent Young; November 4, 1949 (age 76) Sacramento, California, U.S.
- Spouses: Suzan Stewart (m. 1972; div. 2010) Marti Young (m. 2011)
- Children: 3
- Education: Brigham Young University (BA); Harvard University (JD)
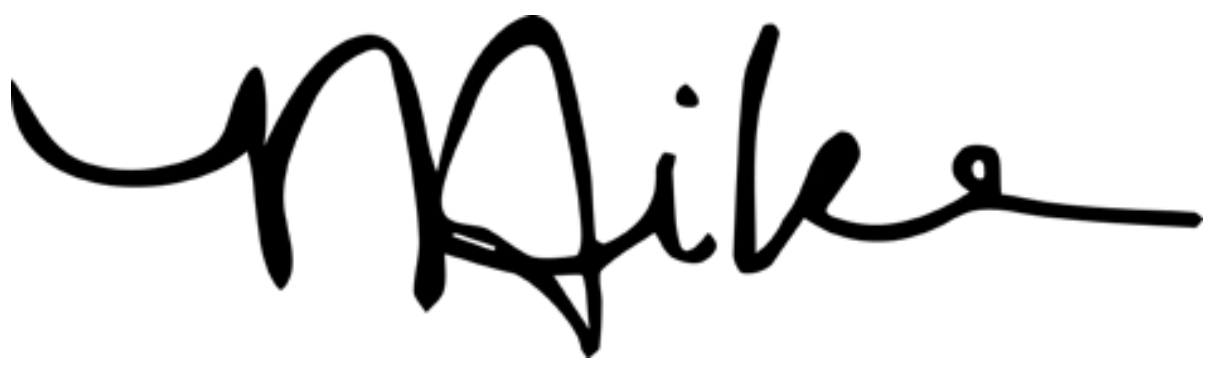
- Signature

Academic work
- Discipline: Jurisprudence
- Institutions: Columbia University; George Washington University; University of Utah; University of Washington; Texas A&M University

Michael Kent Young (born November 4, 1949) is an American lawyer. He served as the 25th president of Texas A&M University from 2015 to 2020, as the 31st president of the University of Washington from 2011 to 2015, as the 14th president of the University of Utah from 2004 to 2011, and as dean of the George Washington University Law School from 1998 to 2004.

== Early life and education ==
Young was born and raised in Sacramento, California. He received a Bachelor of Arts with majors in political science and Japanese from Brigham Young University in 1973 and a Juris Doctor from Harvard Law School in 1976.

== Career ==
After law school, his judicial clerkships, and positions at two law firms, Young joined the United States Department of State and served as Deputy Legal Adviser, Deputy Under Secretary for Economic and Agricultural Affairs, and Ambassador for Trade and Environmental Affairs in the Bush administration. Among many other international agreements, Young worked on treaties related to German unification, as well as the North American Free Trade Agreement (NAFTA) and Uruguay Round negotiations leading to the World Trade Organization and Earth Summit.

Following his work at the United States Department of State, Young became a professor and administrator at Columbia University from 1994 to 1998 and at George Washington University from 1998 to 2004. His academic positions included serving as Fuyo Professor of Japanese Law and Legal Institutions and Director of the Columbia Law School Center for Japanese Legal Studies, and as Dean and Lobingier Professor of Comparative Law and Jurisprudence at George Washington University Law School.

Young served as the 14th president of the University of Utah from August 2004 to May 2011. He served as the 31rd president of the University of Washington from July 2011 to April 2015.

=== Texas A&M University ===
Young became president of Texas A&M University in May 2015.

Young announced his intention to retire from the presidency of Texas A&M University on September 2, 2020, to be effective in May 2021. In November, the university announced that the resignation would take effect earlier on December 31, 2020. Young expressed his desire to join the Bush School of Government and Public Service at the Texas A&M University, where he would become the first director of the Institute for Religious Liberties and International Affairs.

== Boards and organizations ==
Young served on the United States Commission on International Religious Freedom from 1998 to 2005, including twice serving as its chair.

He is a member of the Council on Foreign Relations and a fellow of the American Bar Foundation.

== Personal life ==
He served as president of the New York Stake of the Church of Jesus Christ of Latter-day Saints from 1985 to 1989.

Young married fellow BYU alumna Suzan Stewart in 1972, whom he met during her freshman year while dating her roommate, and they are the parents of three children. They divorced in 2010.

On June 3, 2011, he married Marti Denkers (Young). Young's relationship with Denkers was the subject of some controversy: Denkers was a student at the University of Utah during the time Young presided over it, and she was formerly married to Steve Denkers, a member of the wealthy Eccles family that has given hundreds of millions of dollars to the University of Utah over the years.

== Honours ==
- Royal House of Portugal: Knight of the Order of Saint Michael of the Wing (2007)

== See also ==
- List of law clerks for the ninth seat of the Supreme Court of the United States
