= Widtsoe (surname) =

Widtsoe is a surname. Notable people with the surname include:

- John A. Widtsoe (1872–1952), Mormon official
- Leah D. Widtsoe (1874–1965), Mormon official, wife of John
- Osborne J. P. Widtsoe (1877–1920), Mormon official and English professor
