= List of Theta Alpha Phi chapters =

Theta Alpha Phi was an American honor society for theatre. It was established in 1919 by members of the National Association of Teachers of Speech. It was organized in December 1919 at a National Association of Teachers of Speech meeting in Chicago, Illinois. Its first chapter, Oklahoma Alpha, was chartered on December 22, 1919 at Oklahoma A&M College, now Oklahoma State University in Stillwater, Oklahoma. The national organization went inactive around 2021, with the remaining chapters either merging into another organization, going inactive, or remaining active as a local organizations.

In the following list, active chapters are noted in bold and inactive chapters and institutions are in italics.

Chapter	Charter date and range	Institution	Locations	Status	Ref.
Oklahoma Alpha	December 22, 1919 – 1934	Oklahoma Agricultural and Mechanical College	Stillwater, Oklahoma	Inactive	
Louisiana Alpha	1919	Louisiana State University	Baton Rouge, Louisiana	Inactive	
Ohio Alpha	1919–2026	Ohio Wesleyan University	Delaware, Ohio	Inactive	
Wisconsin Alpha	1919–1947	Ripon College	Ripon, Wisconsin	Inactive	
**Florida Alpha**	1919	Stetson University	DeLand, Florida	Active	
Pennsylvania Alpha	1919	Bucknell University	Lewisburg, Pennsylvania	Inactive	
California Alpha	1920	University of Redlands	Redlands, California	Inactive	
Connecticut Alpha	1920–1942	University of Connecticut	Storrs, Connecticut	Inactive	
Missouri Alpha	1920–1934	University of Missouri	Columbia, Missouri	Inactive	
Arizona Alpha	1920–1934	University of Arizona	Tucson, Arizona	Inactive	
Colorado Alpha	1920–1934	Colorado College	Colorado Springs, Colorado	Inactive	
Oklahoma Beta	1920	University of Tulsa	Tulsa, Oklahoma	Inactive	
South Dakota Alpha	1920–1937	Huron University	Huron, South Dakota	Inactive	
California Beta	1920–1930	Occidental College	Los Angeles, California	Inactive	
Iowa Alpha	1920–1954	Parsons College	Fairfield, Iowa	Inactive	
Ohio Beta	1920	Baldwin–Wallace College	Berea, Ohio	Inactive	
Oregon Alpha	1920	Willamette University	Salem, Oregon	Inactive	
Utah Alpha	1920–1954	University of Utah	Salt Lake City, Utah	Inactive	
South Dakota Beta	1920	Dakota Wesleyan University	Mitchell, South Dakota	Inactive	
Tennessee Alpha	1920–1934	University of Tennessee	Knoxville, Tennessee	Inactive	
Pennsylvania Beta	1921–1934	University of Pittsburgh	Pittsburgh, Pennsylvania	Inactive	
Montana Alpha	1921	University of Montana	Missoula, Montana	Inactive	(Note: Chapter formed at Montana State University, now University of Montana.)
Wyoming Alpha	1921	University of Wyoming	Laramie, Wyoming	Inactive	
**Michigan Zeta**	1921–1934; after 1963	Adrian College	Adrian, Michigan	Active	(Note: This first chapter in Michigan was named Zeta for unknown reasons.)
Michigan ?	1921	Kalamazoo College	Kalamazoo, Michigan	Inactive	
Hawaii Alpha	1921–1935	University of Hawaiʻi	Honolulu, Hawaii	Inactive	
Alabama Alpha	1921–1934	Alabama Polytechnic Institute	Auburn, Alabama	Inactive	
South Dakota Gamma	1921–1934	University of South Dakota	Vermillion, South Dakota	Inactive	
Indiana Alpha	1922	Indiana University Bloomington	Bloomington, Indiana	Inactive	
Michigan ?	1922–1934	Hillsdale College	Hillsdale, Michigan	Inactive	
**California Gamma**	1922	University of the Pacific	Stockton, California	Active	
Oklahoma Gamma	1922	Oklahoma Baptist University	Shawnee, Oklahoma	Inactive	
Michigan Alpha	1922–1934	Knox College	Galesburg, Illinois	Inactive	
Ohio Gamma	1922–1934	Heidelberg College	Tiffin, Ohio	Inactive	
Washington Alpha	1922–1935	College of Puget Sound	Tacoma, Washington	Inactive	
Ohio Delta	1922	Wittenberg College	Springfield, Ohio	Inactive	
Missouri Beta	1923	Park College	Parkville, Missouri	Inactive	
Pennsylvania Gamma	1923	Pennsylvania State University	University Park, Pennsylvania	Inactive	
Iowa Beta	1923	State College of Iowa University of Northern Iowa	Cedar Falls, Iowa	Inactive	(Note: Chapter formed at the State College of Iowa, now the University of Northern Iowa.)
Pennsylvania Delta	1923	University of Pennsylvania	Philadelphia, Pennsylvania	Inactive	
**Missouri Gamma**	1923–1940; after 1963	Culver–Stockton College	Canton, Missouri	Active	
Montana Beta	1923–1954	Carroll College	Helena, Montana	Inactive	(Note: Chapter formed at Mount St. Charles College, now called Carroll College.)
**Indiana Beta**	1923	Franklin College	Franklin, Indiana	Active	
South Dakota Delta	1923–1934	Yankton College	Yankton, South Dakota	Inactive	
Montana Gamma	1923–1934	Montana College of Agriculture and Mechanic Arts	Bozeman, Montana	Inactive	
Kansas Alpha	1923–1934	Kansas State Teachers College of Pittsburg	Pittsburg, Kansas	Inactive	
South Dakota Epsilon	1923–1939	Northern Normal and Industrial School	Aberdeen, South Dakota	Inactive	
North Dakota Alpha	1923–1934	Jamestown College	Jamestown, North Dakota	Inactive	
Nebraska Alpha	1923	Nebraska Wesleyan University	Lincoln, Nebraska	Inactive	
Illinois Beta	1923	Illinois Wesleyan University	Bloomington, Illinois	Inactive	
South Carolina Alpha	1924–1934	Presbyterian College	Clinton, South Carolina	Inactive	
**Ohio Epsilon**	1924	Ohio Northern University	Ada, Ohio	Active	
Michigan Delta	1924	Michigan State University	East Lansing, Michigan	Inactive	(Note: Chapter formed at Michigan Agricultural College, now Michigan State University.)
Utah Beta	1924	Brigham Young University	Provo, Utah	Inactive	
Illinois Gamma	1924	Bradley University	Peoria, Illinois	Inactive	(Note: Chapter formed at Bradley Polytechnic Institute, now Bradley University.)
North Carolina Alpha	1925–1954	Duke University	Durham, North Carolina	Inactive	
Virginia Alpha	1925	College of William & Mary	Williamsburg, Virginia	Inactive	
Louisiana Beta	1925–1933	Tulane University	New Orleans, Louisiana	Inactive	
**Missouri Delta**	1925–1934; after 1963	University of Central Missouri	Warrensburg, Missouri	Active	(Note: Chapter formed at Central Missouri State Teachers, now the University of Central Missouri.)
Illinois Delta	1926	Illinois State University	Normal, Illinois	Inactive	
Kansas Beta	1926	Emporia State University	Emporia, Kansas	Inactive	(Note: Chapter formed at Kansas State Teachers College, now Emporia State University.)
Tennessee Delta	1927	Maryville College	Maryville, Tennessee	Inactive	
Ohio Zeta	May 31, 1927	Otterbein College	Westerville, Ohio	Inactive	
Utah Gamma	1927	Utah State University	Logan, Utah	Inactive	(Note: Chapter formed at the Utah State Agricultural College, now Utah State University.)
New Mexico Alpha	1928–1945	University of New Mexico	Albuquerque, New Mexico	Inactive	
Kansas Gamma	1928–1934	College of Emporia	Emporia, Kansas	Inactive	
Indiana Gamma	1929	Purdue University	West Lafayette, Indiana	Inactive	
Iowa Gamma	1929	Drake University	Des Moines, Iowa	Inactive	
**Michigan Epsilon**	1929	Albion College	Albion, Michigan	Active	
Ohio Eta	1930	Hiram College	Hiram, Ohio	Inactive	
Pennsylvania Epsilon	1931	Grove City College	Grove City, Pennsylvania	Inactive	
New York Alpha	1933–1954	Alfred University	Alfred, New York	Inactive	
Pennsylvania Zeta	1933	Temple University	Philadelphia, Pennsylvania	Inactive	
New York Beta	1934	Ithaca College	Ithaca, New York	Inactive	
Florida Beta	1936–1954	University of Miami	Coral Gables, Florida	Inactive	
**Indiana Delta**	1936	Indiana State University	Terre Haute, Indiana	Active	
**Florida Gamma**	1938	Rollins College	Winter Park, Florida	Active	
Illinois Epsilon	1938	Eastern Illinois University	Charleston, Illinois	Inactive	(Note: Chapter formed at Eastern Illinois State Teachers College, now Eastern Illinois University.)
California Delta	1940	University of California, Santa Barbara	Santa Barbara, California	Inactive	(Note: Chapter formed at Santa Barbara State College, now the University of California, Santa Barbara.)
Ohio Theta	1941	University of Cincinnati	Cincinnati, Ohio	Inactive	
**Ohio Iota**	1945	Bowling Green State University	Bowling Green, Ohio	Active	
Tennessee Epsilon	1950	Tennessee State University	Nashville, Tennessee	Inactive	(Note: Chapter formed at the Tennessee Agricultural & Industrial State College, now Tennessee State University.)
Indiana Epsilon	1950	Hanover College	Hanover, Indiana	Inactive	
Arkansas Alpha	1952	Henderson State University	Arkadelphia, Arkansas	Inactive	(Note: Chapter formed at Henderson State Teachers College, now Henderson State University.)
**Wisconsin Delta**	1953	University of Wisconsin–Whitewater	Whitewater, Wisconsin	Active	
Illinois Zeta	1953	Wilbur Wright College	Chicago, Illinois	Inactive	
Alabama Beta	1954	Samford University	Birmingham, Alabama	Inactive	(Note: Chapter formed at Howard College, now called Samford University.)
Washington Gamma	March 1957	Western Washington University	Bellingham, Washington	Inactive	
**New Jersey Alpha**	1960	Stevens Institute of Technology	Hoboken, New Jersey	Active	
Texas Alpha	1960	Howard Payne University	Brownwood, Texas	Inactive	
**Louisiana Gamma**	March 1965	Grambling State University	Grambling, Louisiana	Active	
Louisiana Delta	May 1966	Southern University	Baton Rouge, Louisiana	Inactive	
**Kentucky Alpha**	November 19, 1968	Morehead State University	Morehead, Kentucky	Active	
**New Jersey Gamma**	1978	Montclair State University	Montclair, New Jersey	Active	
**Arkansas Beta**		Ouachita Baptist University	Arkadelphia, Arkansas	Active	
**Illinois Iota**	May 28, 1968	Elmhurst University	Elmhurst, Illinois	Active	
**Ohio Eta**		Ohio State University at Mansfield	Mansfield, Ohio	Active	
**Ohio Kappa**		Denison University	Granville, Ohio	Active	
Nebraska Beta		Hastings College	Hastings, Nebraska	Inactive	
Wyoming Alpha		University of Wyoming	Laramie, Wyoming	Inactive	
