= Post–World War II Utah =

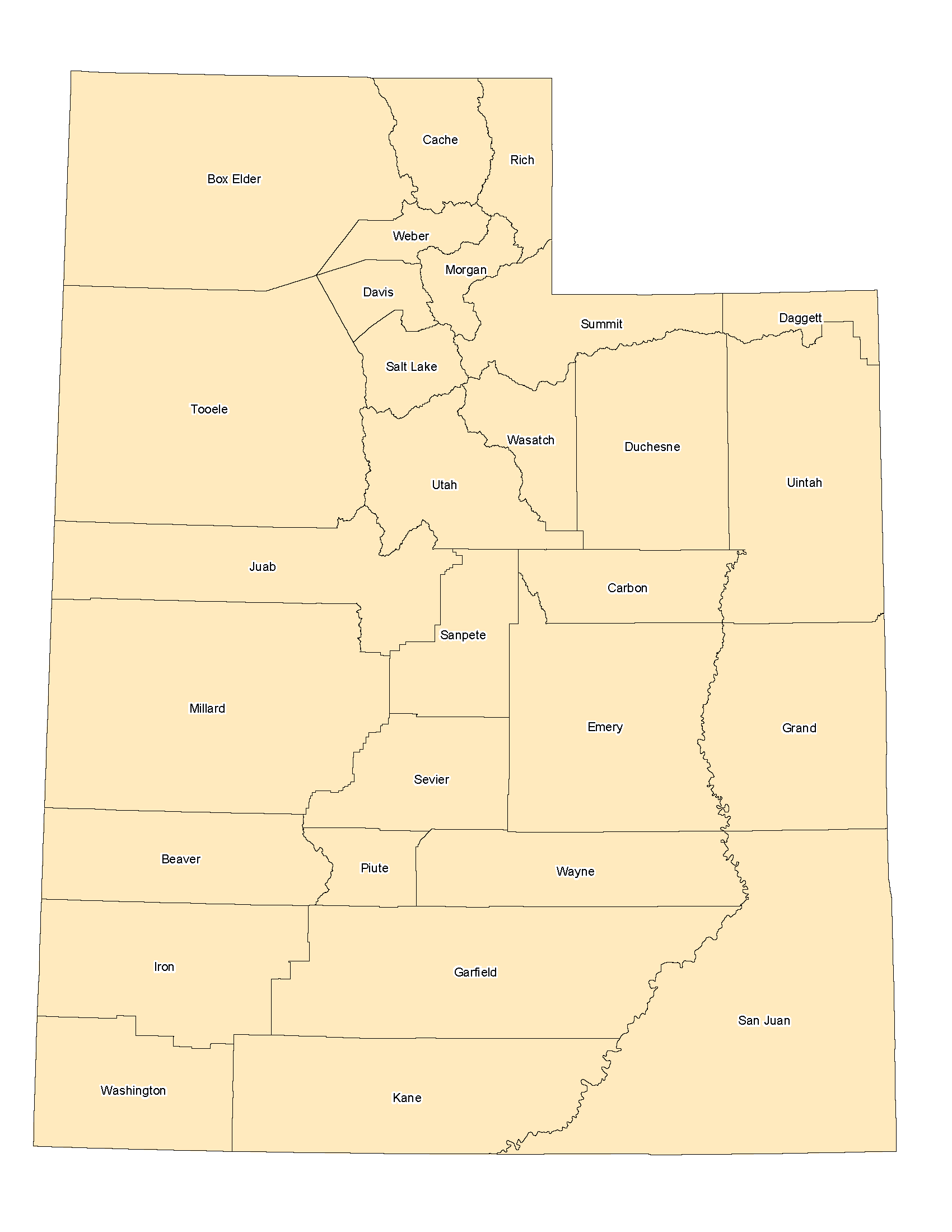
Map of Utah

When World War II ended in 1945, all Americans had to return to a state of normalcy. Utahns had their own unique experience transitioning to normal after the war. The fact that Utah had a majority population that was both white and LDS meant that its demographics were different than any other state in the country. This caused many differences in how Utah had to transition after the war. Utah had changed a lot during the war, with about 70,000 residents going off to fight in the war. Almost 1500 Utah residents were casualties of World War II. Whenever these soldiers returned from the war, they wanted to attend school. The G.I. Bill allowed many men to return from war and immediately begin their schooling at one of the multiple universities in the state. While many were off fighting in the war, life on the home front changed as well. Economic devastation brought on by the Great Depression created a need for change and wartime industry brought on post-war economic improvement. A Japanese Internment Camp was set up in Utah in 1942 while shutting down in 1945. Many of these Japanese Americans resettled in the state, causing a racial divide in the previously white and LDS-dominated state. To remember those who have fallen and reflect on these changes that occurred, 38 total WWII memorials have been built throughout the state of Utah.

== Secondary Education ==
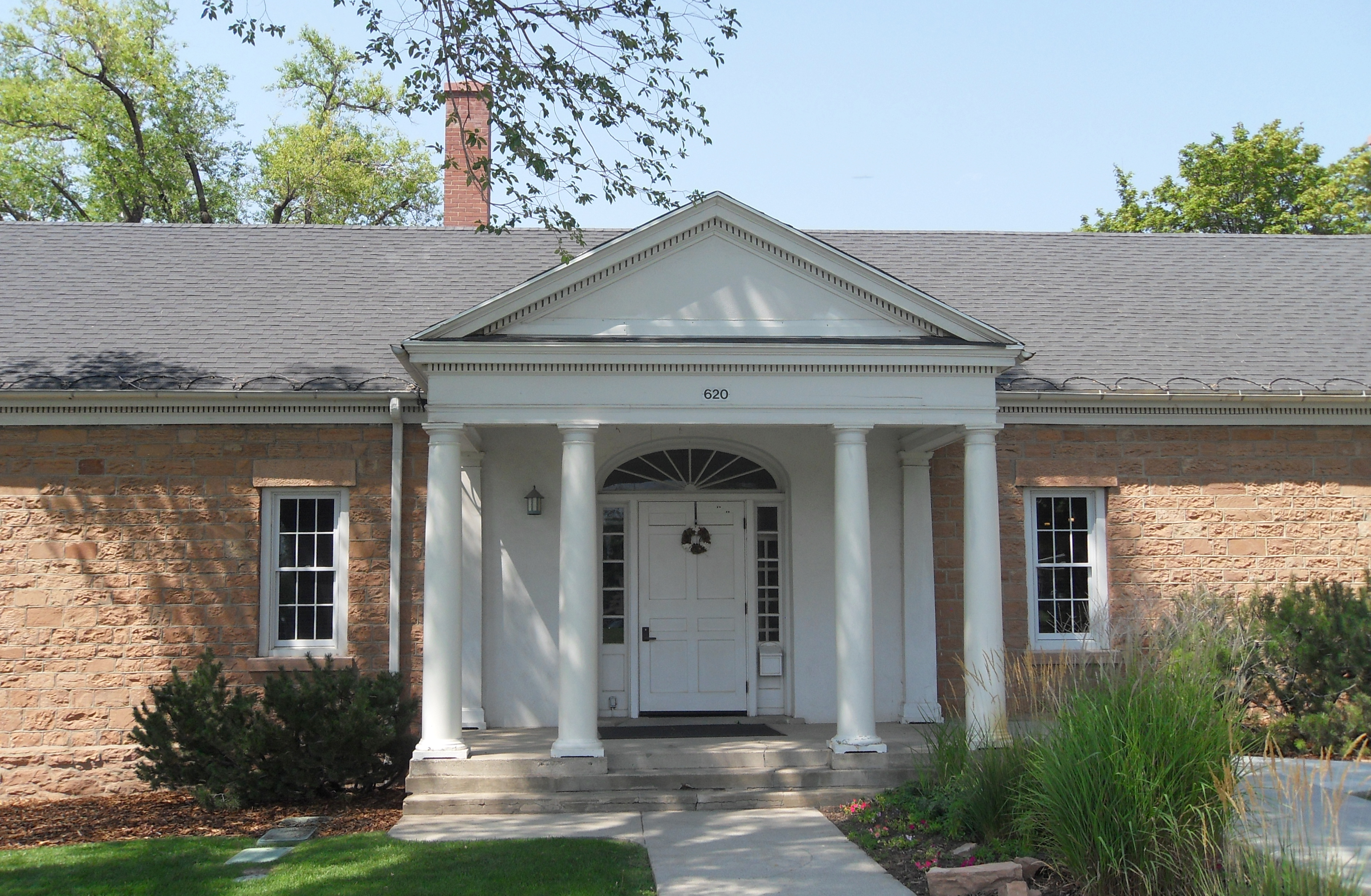
Commander's House in Camp Douglas. Now owned by the University of Utah.

With the end of the war came the homecoming of the soldiers fighting in the war. This meant that thousands of young men came home to Utah. Because of the large religious population, many of these veterans were either already married or got married very quickly after returning home from the war. They also quickly rushed to begin their schooling. The G.I. Bill provided tuition payments for high school and college to those that had fought for the United States. This allowed for Americans who had left to fight right after they graduated high school to return home and start college without any economic consequences for themselves. We see the effects of this bill in Utah. Both the University of Utah and Brigham Young University enrollments almost doubled between the years of 1944 and 1946. Because of when soldiers were discharged from the army, most were able to return to school for the winter semester in 1946. The University of Utah reported getting about 1200 veterans at their front door months before this semester started in order to enroll in the university. This large and immediate increase of students came after enrollment levels had dropped during the war to about 25% of what it had been before the war. This led to many changes that needed to be made on these campuses.

In Salt Lake, UofU president, A. Ray Olpin, with permission from the U.S. Government began using nearby Army camp, Fort Douglas, as housing to support the new growing student body. Down in Provo, BYU president, Howard S. McDonald, received “surplus military housing from Ogden” to create a new dorm complex, now Wymount Terrace. However, President Olpin saw a problem that was more pressing than housing for single men: housing for married students and their families. He created Stadium Village, a dormitory complex created from former army barracks, for the specific purpose of housing the married students enrolled in his college. This complex was so popular for married veteran students that it was at one point the “fastest-growing area on the Wasatch Front.” Later in 1948, the government would turn over more and more portions of Fort Douglas to the University of Utah in order to help them meet the demands that these veterans were putting on them.

Growth in both of these universities happened in other ways than just an increase in student enrollment. BYU added 80 new faculty members to teach all of these students that were coming to the school. The University of Utah added over 200 acres of land in order to meet demand. It also grew into a large research university because of the increase of students seen in the post-war era. Grant money received in 1946 totaled a little over $180,000. This amount grew to over $10,000,000 by 1963. This growth shows the prestige that the University could claim because of how much it grew after World War II.

While BYU and UofU are the two largest universities in the state of Utah, we see this pattern of college enrollment growth in all colleges in Utah including Utah State University, Utah Tech University (then Dixie Junior College), and Utah Valley University (then Utah Trade Technical Institute).

== Economic Growth ==
During the Great Depression, jobs were slim. World War II brought on a need for various materials and commodities that allowed for many jobs to be created as a result. The local and federal governments worked individually and collaboratively to provide different means of producing war time necessities such as ammunition, aviation, and various aluminum, steel and oil plants. These efforts assisted the United States in their war-efforts while simultaneously pulling Utah out of the economic crisis onset by the Great Depression and producing hundreds of thousands of jobs.

Ammunition

Ammunition is a highly needed commodity during war time. Salt Lake City was home of the “second largest in production cost” steel production plant named the Salt Lake City Utah Ordinance Plant (a.k.a. Remington Arms). This branch of the Remington Arms Plant had a very significant effect on the economic state and potential of Utah at this time. 15,000 Utahans were trained in a variety of skills such as “assembly-line procedures, industrial techniques, mechanical trades, and technological skills” in order to have the necessary knowledge and abilities to work in the plant. These skills learned provided them with a sustainable job during the war, as well as left them with useful skills following the war. Both the construction and operating phases of the plant led to a significant wage boost in the Salt Lake area as well. As the war began to wind down and an eventual victory was in sight, the government felt it wise to pull funds from the Remington Arms Plant in Salt Lake City. This led to its eventual closure in November 1943, though even at its termination it provided economic relief to the area. Surplus war goods estimated around $200 million was sold as excess “to businessmen, veterans, local governments, and nonprofits organizations” producing a wonderful economic boost and leaving the state of Utah with a stockpile of goods and industrial plants to stay above the ruins of economic devastation.

While the Salt Lake City Utah Ordinance Plant was the plant that had the largest impact on the state at this time, there were a few other small ammunition plants that had some weight in aiding the economic state of Utah at this time. One example is the Ogden Arsenal and small ammunition plant. During 1942 it employed a hefty “10 percent of all the persons engaged in non-agricultural employment”. This plant is an example of a smaller plant that provided jobs to its local community and greatly reduced the unemployed.

Aviation

Aviation in the United States was greatly altered as a result of WWII and Utah was no exception to this. In fact, due to a number of factors, Utah was able to take part in the changing world of aviation at a larger rate compared to many of its fellow states. This was as a result of its location and geographic qualities, as well as its state leaders taking an interest in evolving the state's involvement in aviation.

Many air bases were built in the state of Utah during war time, as well as 6 military flying fields. Utah also became home to other types of aviation aid at this time such as “logistical support facilities for air route and maintenance and material production”. As a result of this massive influx of air bases, a slew of jobs were created numbering 40,000. These bases were also run on the federal government's dollar, meaning that thousands upon thousands of dollars were being poured into the state of Utah's economy from these thousands of paychecks being earned, greatly benefiting the state's economy.

Aluminum, Steel and Oil Plants

Due to the presence of many natural commodities, different necessary goods were retrieved or forged as a result of wartime need. Because the United States had a need for things such as aluminum and oil, the Senator of Utah at the time, Abe Murdock, used this as an opportunity to employ government financial aid to expand these plants for a higher rate of production. Some of these attempts were met with approval, while others never made it past the planning phases, but in all cases jobs were created and it improved the economic status of the state.

In 1941, Utah emphasized its “alunite and potash deposits found near Marysvale in Piute County” and it was estimated by the United States Bureau of Mines that there was a significant amount of these minerals present in the state, enough, in fact, to warrant building a new plant. This proved to be a highly debated topic, however, as after the plant was approved to be built in 1941, multiple changes to the original plans and location occurred, resulting in the original large aluminum plant in Marysvale was altered to become a smaller plant in Salt Lake City. After its eventual construction, it was used for a few years, but was ultimately sold and turned into a “ phosphate fertilizer plant” in 1945. Although its original purpose was not realized for long, during its time as an aluminum plant and later a fertilizer plant, the building of this plant led to the creation of many jobs and an improvement in the state's economy.

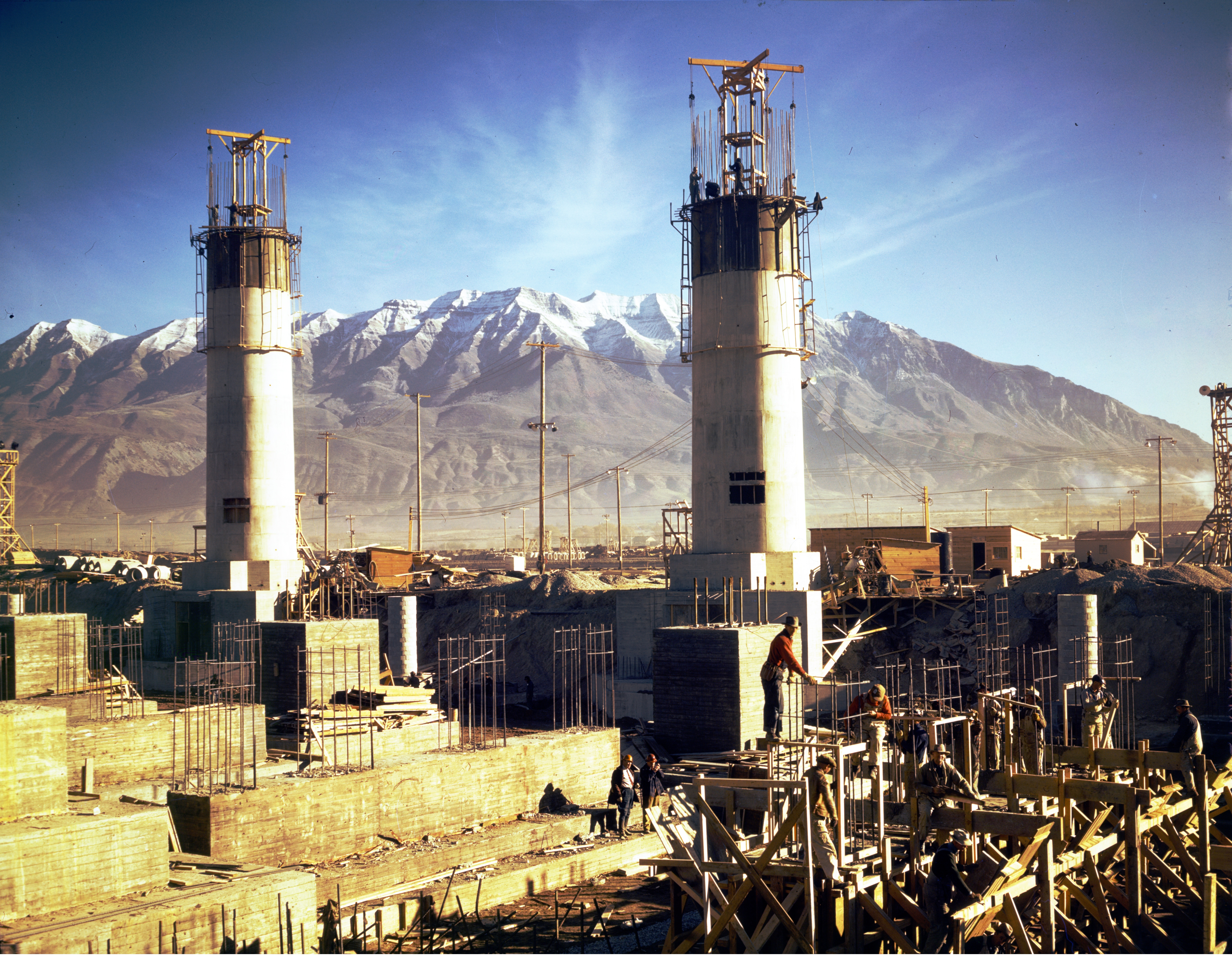
The Geneva Steel Plant was one of the most notable contributions to the Utah economy as a result of World War II.

Steel plants were another notable type of plant that began to crop up during WWII and had a notable impact on post-war Utah. Geneva Steel being the largest and most prominent, running from November 1941 to December 1944. During its construction it employed upwards of 10,000 workers and provided jobs in this time of need that had great impact on the families in the Utah community. Post-war, it has continued to have an effect up until the present, providing many jobs and attracting many forms of industry to the area up until its closure in 2001.

Oil refineries were another type of plant that were created and used as a wartime need that led to vast economic growth. At the start of the war in November 1939, a pipeline was built from Wyoming to Utah for oil travel. The pipeline cost $4,500,000 to erect and its construction led to the employment of “between 12,000 and 50,000” men. The Salt Lake Oil Refinery also produced thousands of jobs. At the end of December 1943, the construction of the plant was called the “No. 1 war job in this area” by the Salt Lake Tribune.

== Japanese Internment Camps ==
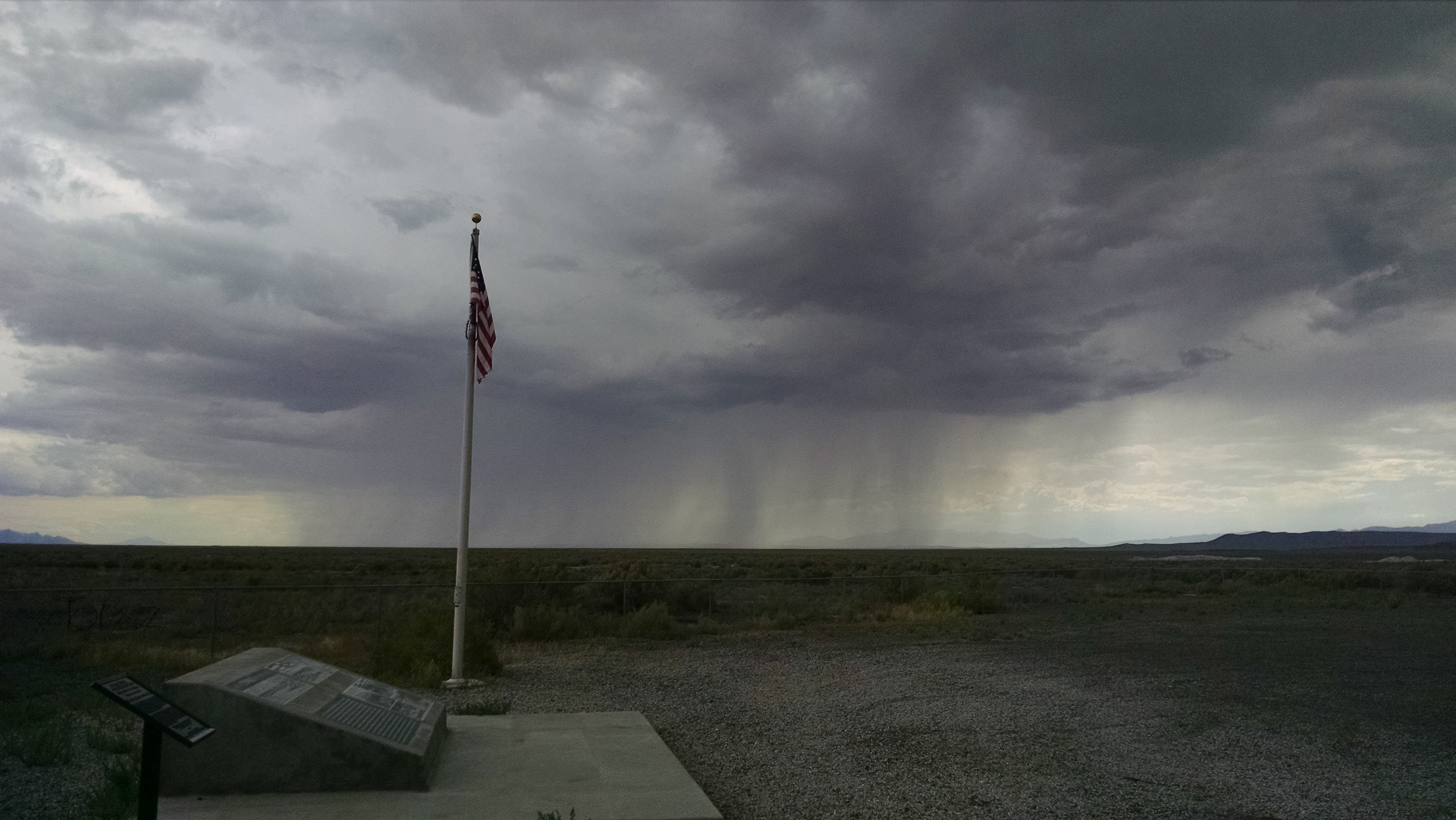
Memorial at the Topaz War Relocation Center

The Topaz War Relocation Camp located in central Utah shut down in 1945. This was one of 10 camps throughout the Western United States. However, before this, Japanese Americans could be resettled into the mountain west or further east. The west coast was off-limits until 1945. The War Relocation Authority was tasked with resettling the prisoners into mainstream America. One of the cities that many settled into was Salt Lake City because of its “comparative tolerance” toward the Japanese Americans than those throughout the rest of the west.

However, this tolerance did not last long. As more Japanese Americans began settling in Utah, those that lived there began to feel anger over how many were settling within the state. Thus began many years of growing resentments by the white Utahns against the Japanese Americans. In 1943, it was found that 80% of industries in both Salt Lake and Ogden “would not hire Japanese Americans.” These feelings would only get worse as many white employees would force their company to fire their Japanese American colleagues.

The hostility began to go down after the war ended, as it was not as popular to hate the Japanese when we were no longer actively fighting them. This means that despite the hatred felt during the war, there were still many recently freed Japanese Americans who remained in Utah. The amount of Japanese Americans living in Utah more than doubled between 1940 and 1950.

== World War II Memorials in the State of Utah ==
There are a total of 38 WWII Memorials. Below is a table containing their names, type of memorial, and location (city).

Name	Type	City
"All Gave Some - Some Gave All"	Monument	Delta
"American Fork Veterans Memorial"	Monument	American Fork
"American Merchant Marine Veterans of WWII and Navy Armed Guard"	Monument	Bluffdale
"Bear River City Veterans Memorial"	Monument	Bear River
"Beaver County Veteran Memorial"	Monument	Beaver
"Captain James B. Austin (WWII)"	Monument	Salt Lake City
"CCC & POW Camp Museum"	Museum	Salina
"Cedar City Veterans Memorial"	Monument	Cedar City
"Disabled American Veterans"	Monument	Salt Lake City
"Eden World War II Memorial"	Monument	Eden
"George Edward Wahlen Memorial"	Marker	Salt Lake City
"Hooper World War II Memorial"	Monument	Hooper
"Historic Wendover Airfield"	Airfield	Wendover
"Magna City World War II Memorial"	Monument	Magna
"Men of Courage Monument"	Monument	Vernal
"Moab Veterans Memorial"	Monument	Moab
"Mt. Calvary Catholic Cemetery Veterans Memorial"	Monument	Salt Lake City
"Ogden City Cemetery WWII Memorial"	Monument	Ogden
"Parowan Veterans Memorial"	Monument	Parowan
"Pleasant Grove Cemetery WWII Flag"	Monument	Pleasant Grove
"Providence World War II Monument"	Monument	Providence
"Randolph World War II Memorial"	Monument	Randolph
"Remember Pearl Harbor (WWII)"	Monument	Saint George
"Salina Cita WWI Memorial"	Monument	Salina
"Sergeant Louis A. Slama Memorial"	Monument	Sandy
"South Ogden Senior Citizen's Center Flag Pole"	Monument	Ogden
"Stilwell Field Monument"	Monument	Salt Lake City
"Topaz Internment Camp WWII"	Internment Camp	Delta
"Topaz Museum"	Museum	Delta
"Topaz Relocation Center WWII"	Monument	Delta
"US Submarine Veterans Memorial	Monument	Bluffdale
"Veteran's Memorial WWI & WWII"	Monument	Antimony
"World War II Memorial Rose Garden"	Monument	Nephi
"World War II Memorial"	Monument	Copperton
"World War II Memorial"	Monument	Mapleton
"World War II Memorial"	Monument	Morgan
"World War II Memorial"	Monument	Vernal
"World War II POW Camp"	Monument	Orem
