= John A. Widtsoe =

Norwegian-American scientist and religious leader (1872–1952)

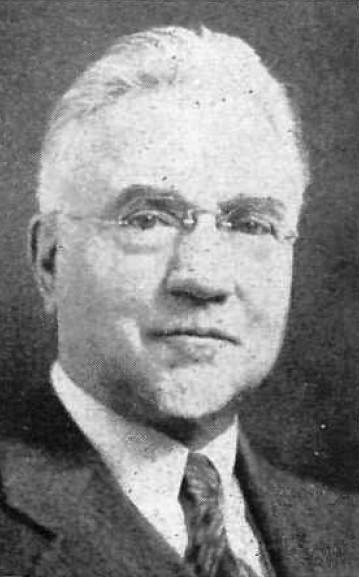

Quorum of the Twelve Apostles
- March 17, 1921 – November 29, 1952

LDS Church Apostle
- March 17, 1921 – November 29, 1952
- Reason: Death of Anthon H. Lund; Anthony W. Ivins added to First Presidency
- Reorganization at end of term: Adam S. Bennion ordained

4th President of the University of Utah
- Predecessor: George Thomas (educator)
- Successor: LeRoy E. Cowles

Personal details
- Born: John Andreas Widtsoe; January 31, 1872; Frøya, Sør-Trøndelag, Norway, United Kingdoms of Sweden and Norway
- Died: November 29, 1952 (aged 80); Salt Lake City, Utah, United States
- Resting place: Salt Lake City Cemetery; 40°46′37.92″N 111°51′28.8″W
- Education: Harvard University (AB); University of Göttingen (MA, PhD)
- Spouse(s): Leah Dunford
- Parents: John and Anna Widtsoe

John Andreas Widtsoe (/ˈwɪtsoʊ/; January 31, 1872 – November 29, 1952) was a Norwegian-American scientist, author, and religious leader who was a member of the Quorum of the Twelve Apostles of the Church of Jesus Christ of Latter-day Saints (LDS Church) from 1921 until his death in 1952.

== Early life ==
Widtsoe was born on the island of Frøya in Sør-Trøndelag county, Norway. At birth his hand was attached to the side of his head, but he had an operation to correct this problem. When Widtsoe was two, his family moved to the Norwegian mainland city of Namsos. His father, also named John, died in February 1878. This left his mother, Anna, as a widow with two young sons to take care of: six-year-old John, and his younger brother Osborne Widtsoe. The family moved to Trondheim, where they were introduced to the LDS Church by a shoemaker.

In 1883, Widtsoe immigrated to the United States with his mother and brother. They arrived in Utah Territory in mid-November. Widtsoe was baptized a member of the LDS Church the following April.

== Education ==
Widtsoe graduated from Brigham Young College in Logan, Utah. He attended Harvard University, graduating with honors in 1894.

In 1898, Widtsoe was ordained to the office of seventy and set apart to do missionary work in connection with his studies in Europe. He entered the University of Göttingen, Germany, and graduated with the degrees of AM and PhD in 1899. For part of his time in Europe, Widtsoe lived in Switzerland. The police wanted proof that he and his wife were married, and since they had neglected to bring their American wedding certificate with them, they were married a second time.

== Academic career ==
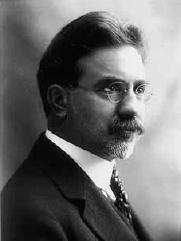
Widtsoe ca. 1920

In August 1900, Widtsoe became the director of the Agricultural Experiment Station at Utah State Agricultural College. While in this position, he founded The Deseret Farmer with Lewis A. Merrill and J. Edward Taylor. Their goal was to have it be a popular magazine that would be read and used by farmers.

In 1905, Widtsoe was dismissed from the agricultural college as a result of political debates about its future and feelings of William Jasper Kerr, the university's president, that Widtsoe was insufficiently supporting him.

For a short time, Widtsoe was a professor of agriculture at Brigham Young University (BYU), and is arguably the founding father of BYU's college of biology and agriculture. (Previously on the BYU campus, the John A. Widtsoe Building was the home of the College of Biology and Agriculture. A new building, the Life Sciences Building, took its place in 2014). Soon, however, he returned to Logan and succeeded Kerr as president of Utah State Agricultural College; he served in this position from 1907 to 1916. He also served as the president of the University of Utah from 1916 until his call as a member of the LDS Church's Quorum of the Twelve in 1921. Widtsoe was the fifth Commissioner of Church Education from 1921 to 1924 and was the seventh commissioner from 1934 to 1936.

During his time as an apostle, Widtsoe taught a religion class at the University of Southern California.

== Federal government work ==
For two years in the 1920s, Widtsoe lived in Washington, D.C., where he supervised the reorganization of the Federal Bureau of Reclamation.

== Service in the Quorum of the Twelve Apostles ==
Widtsoe was closely associated with the Improvement Era even before he became an apostle. He was associate editor of the magazine from 1935 until 1952. As editor of the Improvement Era, Widtsoe "directed its growth from a magazine primarily for the youth to the voice of the whole Church". One of Widtsoe's employees while at the magazine was Hugh Nibley, who Widtsoe convinced to become a professor at BYU.

Widtsoe was also a member of the church's Genealogy Committee, where he pushed for creation and adoption of the Temple Index Bureau.

=== Missions to Europe ===
In 1923, Widtsoe accompanied fellow apostle, Reed Smoot, on a journey to Great Britain and the Scandinavian countries, during which they secured recognition and opened the way for missionaries of the church to return to these lands.

From 1926 until 1932, Widtsoe served as president of the European Mission. While in this office, he convinced the First Presidency to call a separate president of the British Mission, so that the president of the European Mission could focus on supervising the missions in continental Europe. While president of the European Mission, Widtsoe dedicated Czechoslovakia for the preaching of the gospel, and worked closely with Arthur Gaeth in starting the mission there.

== Marriage and writings ==
Widtsoe married Leah Dunford, a daughter of Susa Young Gates, who was a daughter of LDS Church president Brigham Young. Their first child, Ann Gaarden Widtsoe, was born in Germany. The couple had eight children, but only three lived to adulthood. Widtsoe worked closely with his wife and mother-in-law on a biography of Young. Widtsoe also edited a book containing Young's significant teachings. Widtsoe was also the lead compiler of Gospel Doctrine, a collection of sermons and teachings of LDS Church president Joseph F. Smith.

Widtsoe and his wife authored The Word of Wisdom: A Modern Interpretation, a book which advocates the incorporation of healthy eating habits into the Word of Wisdom.

Widtsoe wrote A Rational Theology as Taught by the Church of Jesus Christ of Latter-day Saints, which has been cited by later LDS authors such as J. Reuben Clark. He also wrote Evidences and Reconciliations, which was a compilation of his Improvement Era writings, answering common questions on matters of faith. In this work, Widtsoe acknowledges that there are multiple interpretations that Latter-day Saints can hold on certain issues. One example is his explanation of the time involved in the creation of the earth: he indicated that faithful Latter-day Saints could hold the "six-day", "six-thousand-years", or the "undefined-period" interpretations of the creation. Although Widtsoe focused on explaining the rationale for the "undefined-period" interpretation, he did not belittle the other two or state that they were unorthodox.

In 1939, Widtsoe published Priesthood and Church Government. His work, The Message of the Doctrine and Covenants, was edited by son-in-law G. Homer Durham, and published after Widtsoe's death. Widtsoe wrote Seven Claims of the Book of Mormon: A Collection of Evidences with Franklin S. Harris, Jr.

Widtsoe wrote a biography of Joseph Smith entitled Joseph Smith: Seeker After Truth Prophet of God. It was published in 1951, and reprinted by Bookcraft in 1957. Widtsoe also wrote Joseph Smith as Scientist: A Contribution to Mormon Philosophy, published by the Young Men's Mutual Improvement Association in 1908. In 1944, his essay, "The Divine Mission of Joseph Smith", was included in Handbook of the Restoration published by Zion's Printing and Publishing Company in Independence, Missouri.

Non-religious books by Widtsoe include Dry-Farming: A System of Agriculture for Countries Under a Low Rainfall (New York: MacMillan, 1920) and Dodge's Geography of Utah.

Widtsoe wrote two autobiographies. The first, In the Gospel Net, largely focused on his mother's conversion to the LDS Church. The second, In a Sunlit Land, told the story of his later life, and included explanations of his educational philosophy.

== Hymns ==
Widtsoe wrote the texts to the hymns "Lead Me into Life Eternal" and "How Long, O Lord Most Holy and True," which appear as numbers 45 and 126 respectively in the 1985 LDS hymnal.

== Death ==
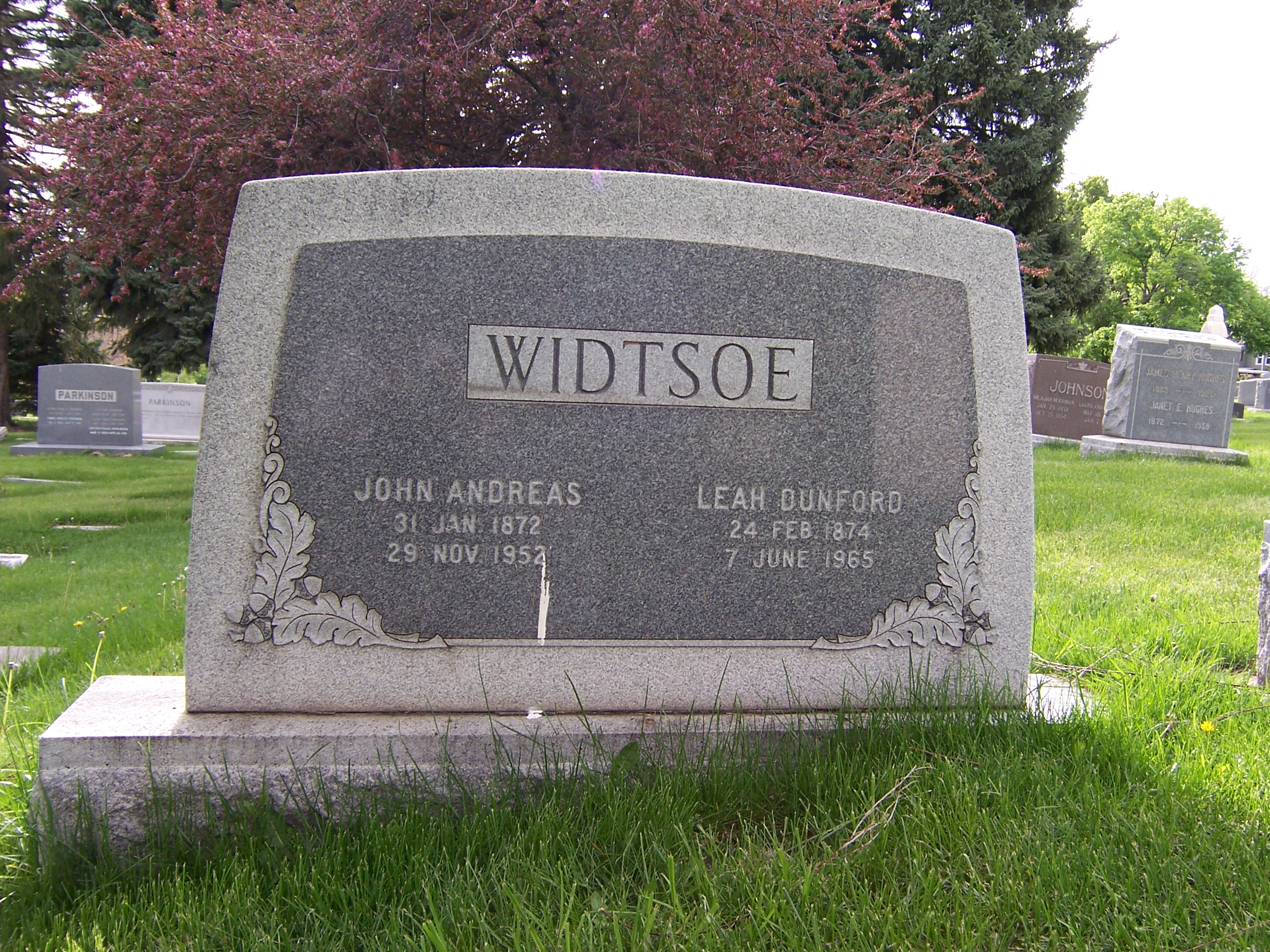
Grave marker of John A. Widtsoe

Widtsoe died in Salt Lake City, of uremia; he also had prostate cancer for several years before his death. He was buried at Salt Lake City Cemetery.

Adam S. Bennion filled the vacancy in the Quorum of the Twelve following Widtsoe's death.

== Published works ==
- Widtsoe, John A. (1906). A Concordance to the Book of Doctrine and Covenants of the Church of Jesus Christ of Latter-day Saints. Salt Lake City UT: Deseret Sunday School Union.
- —— (1908). Joseph Smith as Scientist: A Contribution to Mormon Philosophy. Salt Lake City UT: General Board Young Men's Mutual Improvement Association.
- ——; William Peterson (1908). Dodge's Geography of Utah. Chicago IL: Rand, McNally & Co.
- —— (1911). Dry-Farming: A System of Agriculture for Countries Under a Low Rainfall. New York NY: Macmillan.
- —— (1914). The Principles of Irrigation Practice. New York NY: Macmillan.
- —— (1915). Rational Theology: As Taught by the Church of Jesus Christ of Latter-day Saints. Salt Lake City UT: General Priesthood Committee of the Church of Jesus Christ of Latter-day Saints.
- —— (1918). Western Agriculture. St. Paul MN: Webb Publishing Co.
- ——; Joseph F. Smith (1919). Gospel Doctrine. Salt Lake City UT: Deseret News.
- —— (1925). Discourses of Brigham Young. Salt Lake City UT: Deseret Book Co.
- —— (1928). Success on Irrigation Projects. New York NY: John Wiley & Sons, Inc.
- —— (1930). In Search of Truth: Comments on the Gospel and Modern Thought. Salt Lake City UT: Deseret Book.
- ——; Franklin S. Harris (1935). Seven Claims of the Book of Mormon: A Collection of Evidences. Independence MO: Zion's Printing and Publishing Co.
- —— (1936). Program of the Church of Jesus Christ of Latter-day Saints. Salt Lake City UT: Department of Education of the Church of Jesus Christ of Latter-day Saints.
- ——; Leah D. Widtsoe (1937). The Word of Wisdom: A Modern Interpretation. Salt Lake City UT: Deseret Book.
- —— (1939). Priesthood and Church Government in the Church of Jesus Christ of Latter-day Saints. Salt Lake City UT: Deseret Book.
- —— (1939). Current Gospel Questions. Salt Lake City UT: General Boards of the Mutual Improvement Associations.
- —— (1941). In the Gospel Net: The Story of Anna Karine Gaarden Widtsoe. Independence, Missouri: Zion's Printing and Publishing Co.
- —— (1943). Your Questions Answered. Salt Lake City UT: General Boards of the Mutual Improvement Associations.
- —— (1943). Evidences and Reconciliations: Aids to Faith in a Modern Day. Salt Lake City UT: Bookcraft.
- —— (1945). Man and the Dragon and Other Essays. Salt Lake City UT: Bookcraft.
- —— (1947). Gospel Interpretations: More Evidences and Reconciliations. Salt Lake City UT: Bookcraft.
- —— (1947). How the Desert was Tamed; A Lesson for Today and Tomorrow. Salt Lake City UT: Deseret Book.
- —— (1949). The Articles of Faith in Everyday Life. Salt Lake City UT: Young Men's and Young Women's Mutual Improvement Associations.
- —— (1951). Joseph Smith: Seeker After Truth, Prophet of God. Salt Lake City UT: Bookcraft.
- —— (1952). In a Sunlit Land: The Autobiography of John A. Widtsoe. Salt Lake City UT: Deseret News Press.
- ——; G. Homer Durham (1969). The Message of the Doctrine and Covenants. Salt Lake City UT: Bookcraft.
- Skanchy, Anthon L. (1915). —— (ed.). Anthon L. Skanchy: A Brief Autobiographical Sketch. Salt Lake City UT.

The Church of Jesus Christ of Latter-day Saints titles
Preceded by Melvin J. Ballard	Quorum of the Twelve Apostles; March 17, 1921 – November 29, 1952	Succeeded by Joseph F. Merrill
Academic offices
Preceded by William Jasper Kerr	President of Utah State University; 1907-1916	Succeeded by Elmer George Peterson
Preceded by Joseph T. Kingsbury	President of the University of Utah; 1916 – 1921	Succeeded by George Thomas
