= George Thomas (educator) =

American academic administrator

5th President of the University of Utah
- In office 1921–1941
- Preceded by: John A. Widtsoe
- Succeeded by: LeRoy E. Cowles

Personal details
- Died: 1951
- Education: Harvard University (BA, MA)

George Thomas (died 1951) was an American academic administrator. He served as the president of the University of Utah from 1921 to 1941. he also served on the faculty at Brigham Young University and Utah State University.
