= Maud Babcock =

First female faculty member at University of Utah (1867-1954)

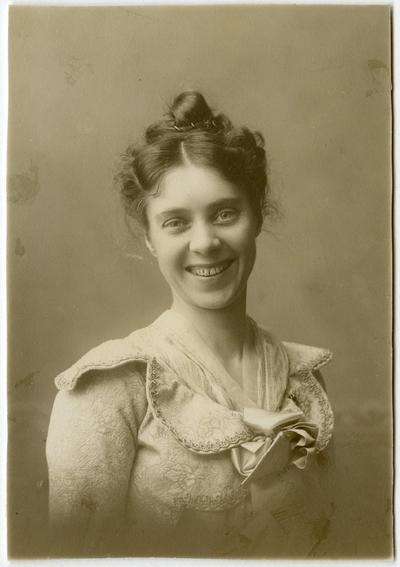
Maud May Babcock

Maud May Babcock (May 2, 1867 – December 31, 1954) was the first female member of the University of Utah's faculty. She taught at the university for 46 years, beginning in 1892. While there she established the University Theater, originated the first college dramatic club in the United States, led the production of the first university stage play, directed over 300 plays and taught. She also founded the Department of Speech and the Department of Physical Education at the University of Utah.

== Life ==
Babcock was born in East Worcester, New York to William Wayne Babcock and Sarah Jane Butler. She was educated in the public schools of Binghamton, New York then received a Bachelor of Arts from Wells College in New York and a Bachelor of Education from the National School of Elocution and Oratory in Philadelphia. In 1890, she graduated from the American Academy of Dramatic Arts with a diploma. At other times in her professional life she studied at the University of Chicago and schools in London and Paris.

=== Professional life ===
While studying and teaching at Harvard University, Babcock met noted Utah resident and daughter of Brigham Young, Susa Young Gates. At the time Gates was a student of Babcock. Gates was impressed by Babcock's work as a summer course instructor in physical culture and convinced her to move to Salt Lake City. Babcock stayed longer in Utah than she intended, becoming a member of the Church of Jesus Christ of Latter-day Saints (LDS Church) four months into her planned one-year stay. At the University of Utah, Babcock founded two departments, the Department of Speech and the Department of Physical Education. She taught in both departments, and became the first female chair of a department at the University of Utah. In 1918 after extensive correspondence she met in person with Maude Adams and they planned a production of The Pilgrim's Progress. WWI canceled that production because no male actors were available. She worked at the university for 47 years. Babcock loved physical activity, and she made valuable contributions to the Deseret Gym. She also established University of Utah's first physical training curriculum, which for several years included speech and dramatics. Babcock made heavy use of the Social Hall for her classes and productions.

She wrote five books on speech and elocution and was a renowned traveler and lecturer in the region. In addition to her professional interests in drama and elocution, she also favored women's suffrage and opposed corsets.

She served as president of the National Association of Teachers of Speech, and was a trustee for the Utah State School for Deaf and Blind for 20 years. In 1907, she was elected to be president of the board of trustees for the school. Along with all of her work in physical education and theater, Babcock was the first woman to serve as chaplain in the Utah senate. Becoming the first woman chaplain in any state senate in the United States.

=== LDS church leadership ===
She joined LDS Church shortly after she moved to Utah and served for several years on the general board of the Young Women's Mutual Improvement Association. She attended the temple regularly, and reported performing over 21,000 vicarious ordinances.

=== Death ===
She died at the age of 87.

== Honors ==
- National president of Theta Alpha Phi (dramatic) for two years
- Honorary member of National League of American Penwomen
- Honorary member of Pi Delta Pi
- The theater at the University of Utah is named after her
