= Ruth Moench Bell =

American educator (1878–1957)

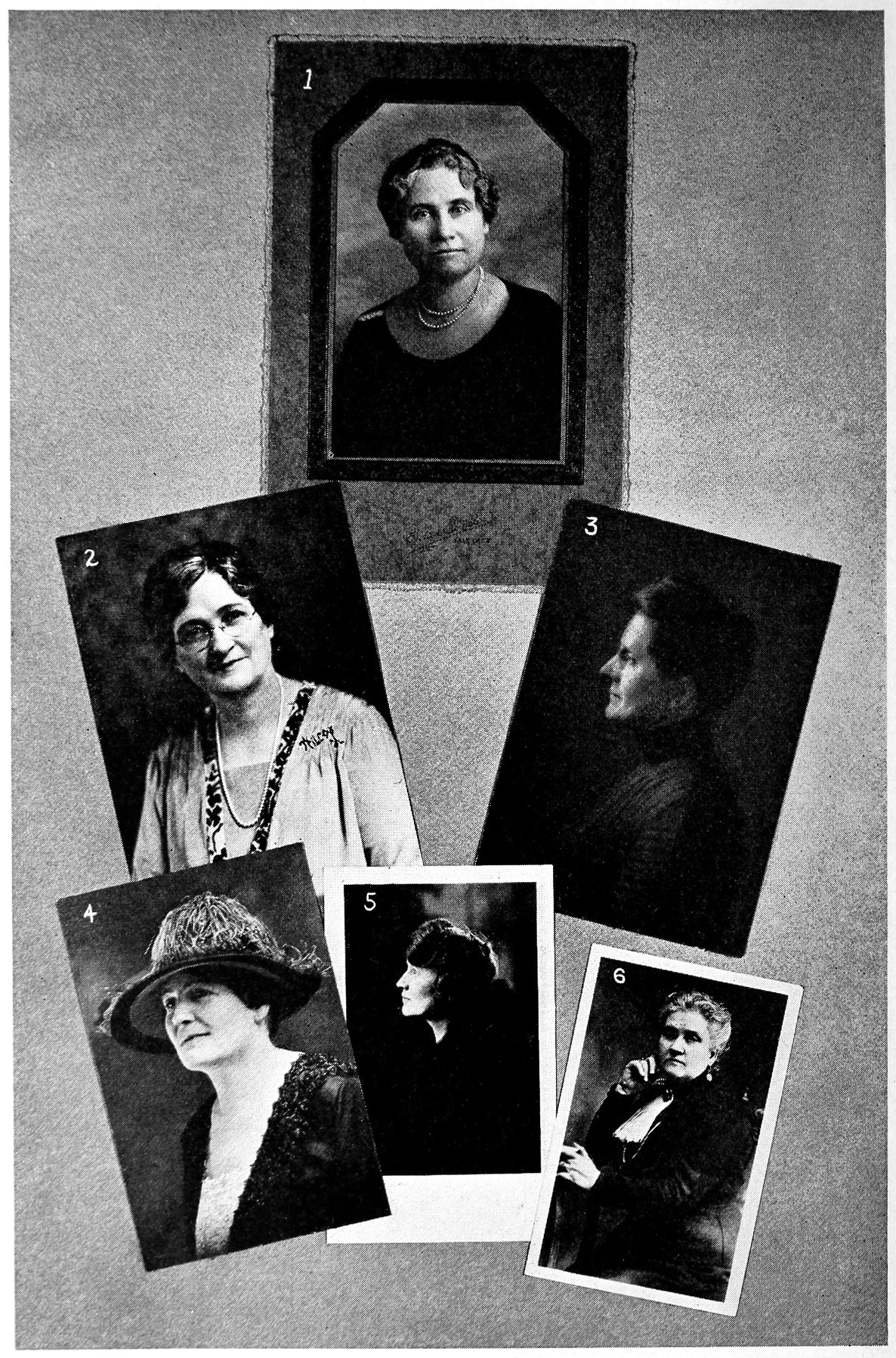
A Few of the Eminent Women of Utah and Wyoming 1. Alice Louise Reynolds, Professor of English Literature, Brigham Young University; 2. Amy Brown Lyman, social worker; 3. Dr. Grace Raymond Hebard, Instructor, University of Wyoming; 4. Mrs. Weston Vernon, teacher of English; 5. Ruth Moench Bell, teacher, Utah Agricultural College; 6. Susa Young Gates, author, woman suffrage leader, genealogist.

Ruthinda Evelyn Moench Bell (January 29, 1878 – September 1, 1957) was a teacher at Utah Agricultural College.

== Biography ==
Ruth Moench Bell was born on January 29, 1878, in Ogden, Utah, the daughter of Louis Frederick Moench (1846–1916) and Ruthinda Eveline Hill (1853–1924).

She graduated from Ashmore School of Expression and had a B.S. from Utah Agricultural College; she attended also University of Chicago, University of California, Berkeley and Columbia University. She studied and traveled in Europe.

She moved to Logan, Utah, and married to George A. Bell (1873–1964). Their children were: Ruth M Bell Hockensmith (d. 1941), Alladine, George, Richard Quentin Bell (1919–2001, American psychologist and educator. Her education included Bachelor of Arts Missouri in 1940; Master of Arts, University Missouri; Doctor of Philosophy, Stanford University in 1941. She was a recipient of the Commendation medal, United States Public Health Service, in 1966. She served as Major, United States Army, from 1946 to 1951. She was a Fellow, American Psychological Association. They lived at 84 East Third St., North, Logan, Utah.

She was a teacher at Utah Agricultural College. She was the head of the Department of Dramatic Art at Utah Agricultural College from 1900 to 1907. She was director of Community Children's Plays, staging her own adaptations of The Blue Bird and Peter Pan. Her serials and plays were published in all the magazines of the state. Her articles appeared in Harper's Weekly, The Delineator, The Woman's Magazine, Boston Cooking School, American Motherhood. She was a writer of scenarios for the Gaumont Company and other film companies. She was the author of Plotting the Play, which carried an introduction by Clayton Hamilton. She was associate founder of the Utah Agricultural College Little Theatre, Campus Players Club and Playmakers Club.

She was also a member of: Business and Professional Women's Club, Utah Agricultural College Faculty League, Utah Agricultural College Woman's Club, Periwig, Theta Alpha Phi.

She died on September 1, 1957, and is buried at Logan City Cemetery, Logan.
