= Susa Young Gates =

American religious leader and writer (1856-1933)

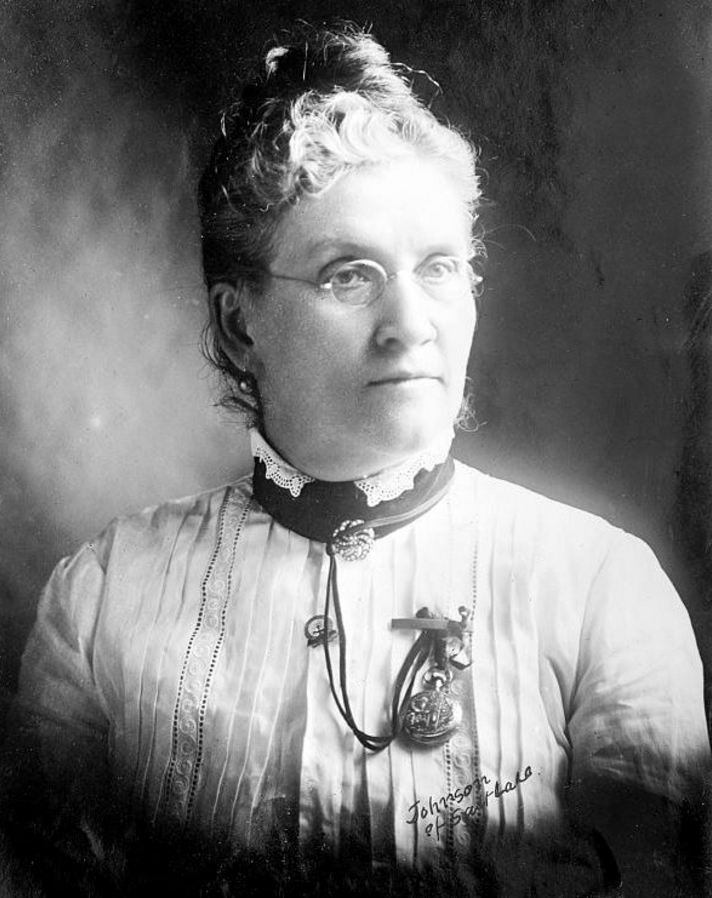

4th President of the Daughters of the Utah Pioneers

In office
- June 3, 1905 – September 15, 1908
- Predecessor: Maria Young Dougall
- Successor: Isabell Whitney Sears

Personal details
- Born: Susa Young; March 18, 1856; Salt Lake City, Utah Territory,
- Died: May 27, 1933 (aged 77); Salt Lake City
- Resting place: Provo City Cemetery; 40.225°N 111.644°W
- Alma mater: Brigham Young Academy
- Notable works: Founded the Young Woman's Journal and the Relief Society Magazine
- Spouse(s): Alma B. Dunford (1872-1877; divorced); Jacob F. Gates (1880-1933)
- Children: 13
- Parents: Brigham Young; Lucy Bigelow

Susa Gates (née Young, formerly Dunford; March 18, 1856 – May 27, 1933) was an American writer, periodical editor, president of the Daughters of Utah Pioneers, and women's rights advocate. She was a daughter of LDS Church president Brigham Young. Throughout her life, Gates wrote many articles, poems, short stories, novels, and other literary works. According to R. Paul Cracroft's thesis, Gates wrote more than other Mormon writers. Gates was also actively involved in the Church of Jesus Christ of Latter-day Saints (LDS Church) where, among other things, she wrote the lesson manuals, was a member of the Relief Society general board, lead genealogical efforts, and served as a missionary.

== Early life ==
Gates was born in Salt Lake City, Utah Territory, to Lucy Bigelow, Brigham Young's twenty-second wife. Gates was named Susanna, but went by Susa for most of her life. She was Brigham's forty-second child and the second child to be born to Lucy Bigelow and Brigham Young. Gates grew up in the Lion House. Her home life was very structured because of the large size of her father's family. Her days consisted of scheduled meals, prayers, schooling, family devotionals, and sleep time. According to Gates, her childhood was very happy and she enjoyed growing up in the Young family. However, Gates also recorded some memories of family difficulties. While Gates reported that she had a close relationship with some of her father's wives, she did not enjoy spending time with all of them. She also rejected any speculation that there was fighting amongst Brigham's wives, while other family members claimed there was tension.

When Gates was born, her father was the president of the LDS Church, the Governor of Utah, and the Superintendent of Indian Affairs. Due to a series of natural disasters, Utah experienced a food shortage and the people living in Utah were required to live off food rations. Gates was also a child during the Utah War which also contributed to the hardship that her family experienced. As a result of the war, Gates moved south temporarily with some of her family to what is now known as Provo.

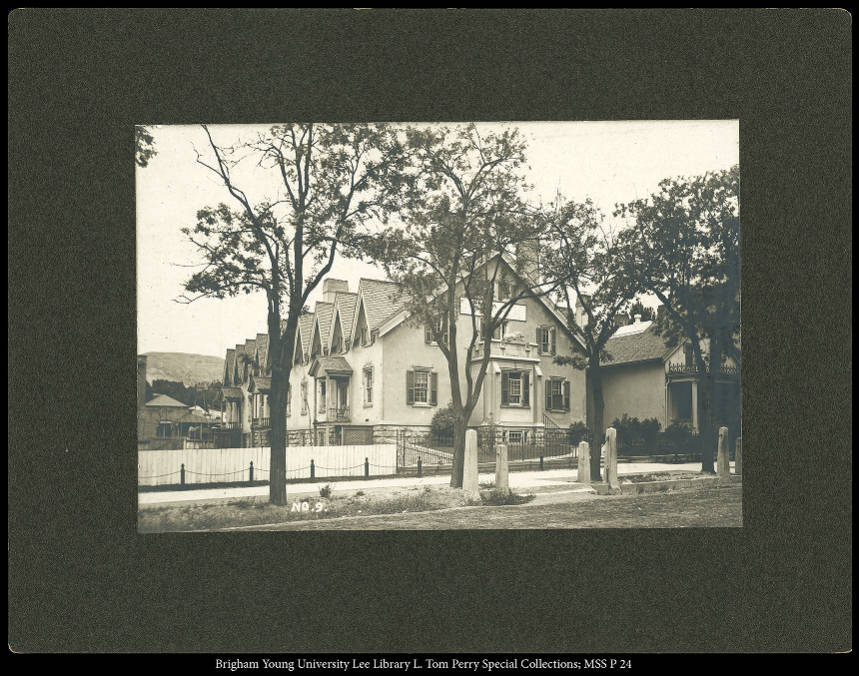
The Lion House where Gates was born and grew up

As was customary in Utah during the time, Gates was trained in drama and dance. She was seven years old when she began to perform in local theaters. Gates thrived in her school and as a result, she entered the University of Deseret at age 13, and by age 14, she had become the editor of the student newspaper, College Lantern. However, her father withdrew her from school and moved her (along with two of his wives and their children) to St. George, Utah. In St. George, Gates continued pursuing an education, but struggled to get along with her new teacher and peers.

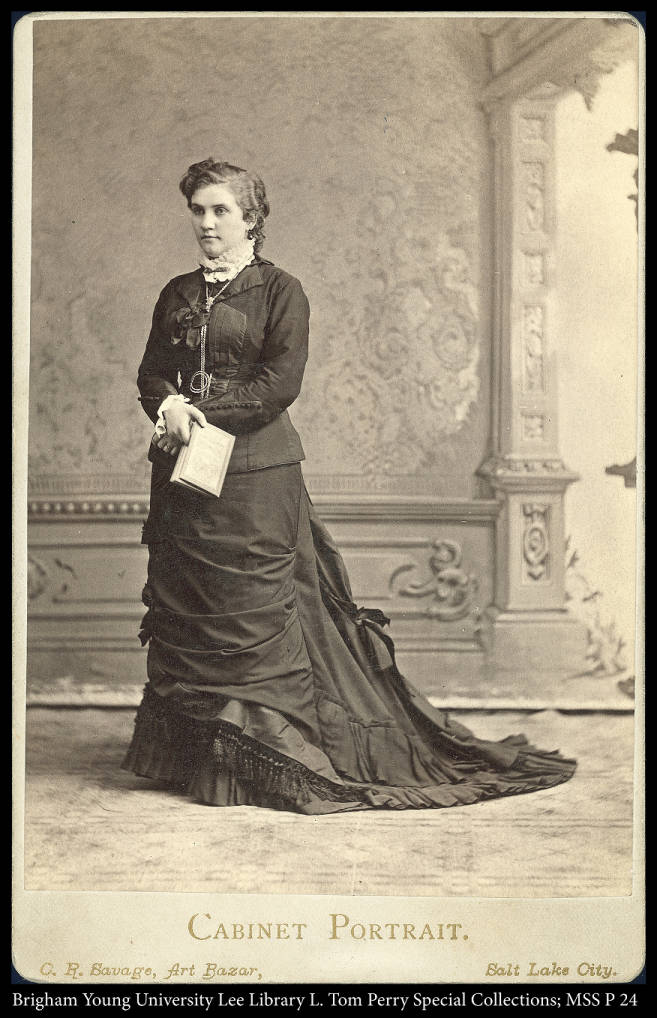
Portrait of Susa Young Gates holding a book

== Education ==
As a child, Gates received an education at a private school owned by Brigham Young across the street from the Lion House. Due to her father's political and religious position and her love of reading, Gates received more education than most children her age. Gates also reports that the education of herself and her siblings was very important to Brigham Young. According to multiple articles she wrote, Gates greatly enjoyed school. Gates wrote that she had opportunities to study music and theatre. She mentioned that her family also regularly participated in minstrel shows as a family activity, often encouraged and led by Brigham Young. During the 19th century, minstrel shows were incredibly popular in Utah.

When Gates was fourteen, she became the associate editor of "The College Lantern," a literary magazine published by the University of Deseret where she was a student. "The College Lantern" was one of the first campus publication in the west. According to Cracroft's thesis, Gates was one of the first people in Utah to learn shorthand. Following her divorce from Dunford, Gates petitioned church leaders to help her continue her education. She was offered a scholarship to the University of Deseret (now known as the University of Utah), but decided to instead attend Brigham Young Academy (now known as Brigham Young University). As a divorced mother, Gates stood out among the other students, however, she was dedicated to her education and worked hard in her courses. While at BYA, Gates taught music lessons. Following the end of her first year at BYA, Gates decided to leave Utah to accompany one of Brigham's other wives to Hawaii.

Gates also attended summer school at Harvard University, but she was not an enrolled, full-time student. At Harvard, she took courses in literature and physical health. This type of summer schooling was common for women during Gates' time. During her time at Harvard, Gates was a student of Maud Babcock, another prominent female member of the church and future fellow member on the board of the Young Women's Mutual Improvement Association.

== Career ==
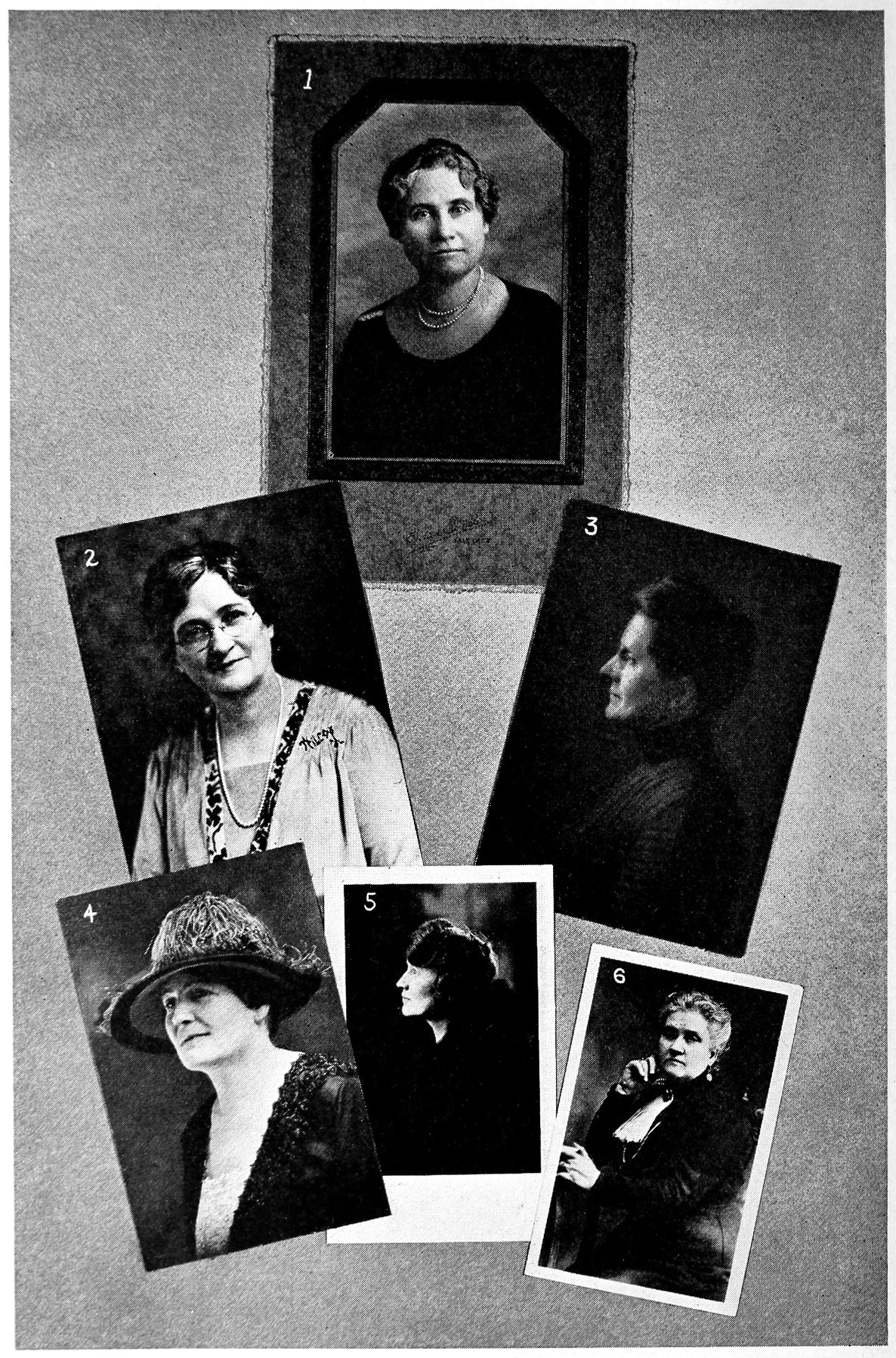
Alice Louise Reynolds, Amy Brown Lyman, Grace Raymond Hebard, Fanny Maughan Vernon, Ruth Moench Bell, Susa Young Gates

=== Academic ===
Gates was involved in different educational institutions in Utah. Gates entered Brigham Young Academy in Provo, Utah, in 1878 where she taught music lessons and founded the music department. In the 1890s, Gates returned to BYU and acted as a board member. While there, Gates created the home economics department and taught a physiology and genealogy class. She was appointed as a member of the board of trustees of the Agricultural College of Utah in Logan, Utah. At the same college, she was also a member on a committee on home economics and art.

=== Founding organizations ===
Throughout her life, Gates founded many organizations. She was one of eight co-founders of the Utah Women's Press Club. She also helped to organize the National Household Economic Association. On May 27, 1870, Gates became the secretary of the Young Ladies Retrenchment Association. The Association was created as a way for young LDS women to support each other and connect with each other. Gates was a primary organizer of the Utah chapters of the Daughters of the American Revolution, Daughters of the Utah Pioneers, and the National Woman's Press Club. Gates was also a member of the Board of Regents of BYU from 1891 to 1933, and Utah State Agricultural College from 1906 to 1912.

=== Political work ===
Gates was involved in political and feminist causes throughout her life. Gates was a member of the National Council of Women (NCW) and she attended multiple NCW conferences. She also served as the chair of the US National Council of Women Press Committee. In 1892, Gates traveled to London to attend a convention of the International Council of Women. Gates was also involved in the Woman Suffrage movement. In the early 1900s, Gates was nominated as the sole delegate from the United States to attend another convention of the International Council of Women in Copenhagen.

Gates was an outspoken proponent of women's suffrage. In 1880, Gates organized a class in St. George which was called "Civil Government." In 1882, Gates was elected as an alternate delegate for a convention of the People's Party, a political group greatly influenced by the church. Throughout her life, Gates was active in promoting women's rights and women's suffrage. She was a founding organizer of the National Household Economics Organization, served as a delegate and speaker to five congresses of the International Council of Women and was a delegate and officer of the National Council of Women. Gates was also elected as an alternate delegate of the Republican National Convention in Chicago in 1908. She attended several Republican National Conventions. Gates was active in politics until 1916, when she retired from her political activism with a few exceptions. Throughout her whole life, Gates was a staunch Republican and espoused conservative ideology.

During some of Gates' career, there was a strong anti-Mormon sentiment in the United States, largely due to the church's practice of polygamy. This caused some disruption in Gates' career as some women did not want to associate with a Utahan or a Mormon. An example of this is when Susan B. Anthony refused to work with Gates anymore because she had not left the religion which practiced polygamy. Throughout her career, Gates defended her religion and contended to be accepted.

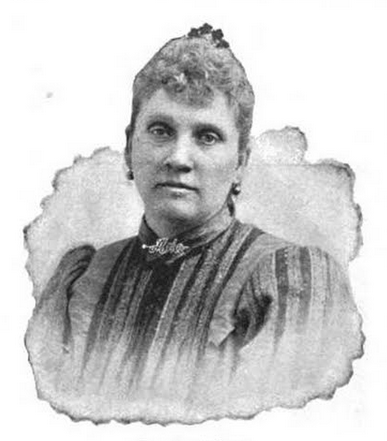
Susa Young Gates (1895)

=== LDS church positions ===
Gates was involved in many different positions in the LDS church. Some of her positions include:

- Member of the Relief Society general board
- Secretary of the Relief Society general board
- Corresponding secretary and editor of the Relief Society Magazine
- Chair of the Genealogical Committee of the Relief Society
- Teachers Committee of the Relief Society general board
- Member of the general board of the Young Ladies' Mutual Improvement Association
- Missionary in Hawaii and the "United States"

While not an official assignment in the church, Gates wrote the first lesson manual for Sunday school lessons. As a prominent member of the church, Gates enjoyed close relationships with church leaders and was able to be influential in some church policies and decisions. Throughout her life, Gates was close friends with Joseph F. Smith, the sixth president of the church. In one letter to Gates, Smith refers to her and her husband as being among his "best and truest friends."

Throughout her career, Gates worked to counteract the commonly held, negative stereotypes surrounding Mormon women. Together, Gates and Leah wrote "Women of the 'Mormon' Church" which has published in 1926. The book focuses on Gates' ideas of the importance of obedience to God and the church and support for women's rights. To promote her book, Gates sent thousands of copies to multiple institutions and newspapers.

=== Genealogy ===
Gates was also active in genealogy and LDS Church temple work. She researched her father's and mothers family history in depth. She managed the genealogy departments in the Deseret News and Inter Mountain Republican, and edited and wrote columns for both papers in 1906. She later became the head of the Research Department and Library of the Genealogical Society of Utah in 1923. Gates was the chair of the Genealogical Committee of the Relief Society. In this position she created monthly lessons on genealogy for other women of the Relief Society. Gates had started to create materials to teach others how to do genealogy before she was in this official position. Gates also published a book called "Surname Book and Racial History" that alphabetically listed common surnames in Utah and the history and original nationality of the name.

In their paper, James B. Allen and Jessie L. Embry write that Gates quickly became a leader in genealogy in Utah, which had recently become quite popular in Utah and in the United States. In the St. George temple, Gates worked as "official stenographer" and was the first woman to be baptized in the temple on behalf of someone who was deceased. Genealogy work was popular among the Mormons because they were able to perform spiritual ordinances on behalf of people who had previously died. Later, Gates was also "official stenographer" at Mormon temples in Logan, Salt Lake City, and Cardston. Part of Gates' genealogical work included creating a thirteen-volume collection that followed the Young family genealogy. The volume contained 20,000 names. After Gates became involved in genealogical work, she donated an additional 10% of her income to the Church for genealogical purposes.

== Writings ==
Throughout her life, Gates was an avid writer and published multiple books and journal articles. Gates also wrote plays, short stories, essays, eulogies, editorials, poetry, newspaper articles, and music lyrics. She sometimes published under the pen name, "Homespun," or sometimes published articles anonymously. In her thesis, Lisa Olsen Tait explains the significance of Gates' pen name. Tait explains that during the time when Gates was publishing, the church was encouraged to manufacture items by themselves in order to avoid spending money at "Gentile" establishments. Brigham Young described this practice as a way to not "please and pamper that power which is opposed to the kingdom of God on earth." Tait argues that Gates selected the pen name of Homespun as a tribute to that council and as a way to show that she was also dedicated to supporting Mormon products and industry and living separately from the world.

=== Genre and Style ===
Gates' works cover multiple genres including fiction, biographies, plays, and cantatas. As was common for Latter-day Saints of the time, the majority of Gates' works were written with an LDS audience in mind. Gates' writings often encouraged other Latter-days Saints to remain engaged in the church and Mormon culture. R. Paul Cracroft's thesis on Gates confirms that Mormon literature during her lifetime was created for the sole purpose of guiding and influencing the Mormon youth to live moral lives and remain involved in the church." Gates' fictional writings often included morals that she felt would benefit her readers. For example, one of her first short stories that was published in a church magazine ends with the main character saying, "Young folks like something bright and gay to read. And novels are as great an educator as the theater. I only wish we had novels or stories written by our own people, with proper lessons taught therein." Her romance pieces were often about young Mormons deciding to marry in the faith, something that Gates herself was strongly encouraged to do. In her romance stories, the young couple often had to overcome challenges that many Mormons were then facing, such as the abandonment of the practice of polygamy and Utah on its path to statehood.

In her thesis about Gates and home literature, Lisa Olsen Tait argues that Gates' characters are rarely a "surprise." Tait writes that it is easy for the reader to instantly tell which character is good and changeable and which is bad and unwilling to change. Tait further argues that this simplistic take on characters was essential for the success of Gates' stories in a Mormon audience of that time because the religion was just beginning to read fiction. Previously, members of the church were greatly discouraged against reading fiction. Tait also stresses that Gates' stories were not about her characters, but rather, about the readers and the morals that she felt that they needed to learn. Some of the morals that Gates included in her writings are obedience to the Word of Wisdom, being dedicated to the church, avoiding gambling, relying on God rather than doctors when ill marrying others Mormons, and not letting wealth and lifestyle prevent church attendance. According to Tait, Gates' most ambitious novel was John Stevens' Courtship, later published as John Stevens' Courtship: A Romance of the Echo Canyon War. Tait says that this work is different from Gates' other stories because it included a much larger cast of characters and focused on relationships with non-Mormon groups of people. However, despite these differences, Tait explains that the central message of the story is still the importance of female virtue and integrity.

The majority of Gates' writings, particularly her stories, include a balance of good and evil. Cracroft explains that Gates "recognized the existence of evil and the need for it to be present in Mormon literature in either two ways: either evil should gain a shocking triumph or should itself succumb to the forces of good, so that Mormon readers can be shown an example of how to merit entrance into Heaven."

Gates tended to write in a very plain and simple way. According to personal writings from Gates, Gates believed that her readers were unable to understand stories on concepts if she did not write plainly. In her published writings, Gates does not often use complicated or confusing metaphors or analogies.

=== Influences ===
Like many Mormon writers at the time, Gates was greatly influenced by her religion. In his thesis, Cracroft argues that one of the reasons that Gates wrote was to preserve the ideals and morals for future generations that she felt were crucial for a successful life. As was common for Mormon writers at the time, Gates was influenced by the desire to ensure that her targeted audience of fellow Latter-day Saints remained faithful. Gates' works were specifically targeted at LDS youth and women. According to Cracroft's thesis, Gates was more willing to talk about sex and other topics considered "taboo" in her time and religion. Gates often wrote about womanhood and urged her readers to "resist evil, sometimes by outsmarting men." According to Cracroft, Gates believed that writing added "glory" to womanhood. Due to Gates' specific target audience, her works did not reach many non-Mormon readers.

=== Works ===
==== Books ====
Gates' published books, biographies, and novels include:

- John Steven's Courtship: A Story of the Echo Canyon War
- The Life Story of Brigham Young (co-authored with daughter Leah D. Widtsoe)
- Lydia Knight's History
- Heroines of Mormondon
- Brigham Young: Patriot, Pioneer, Prophet
- The Prince of Ur (co-authored with daughter Leah Widtsoe)
- Women of the "Mormon" Church
- The Little Missionary
- Up From Tribulation
- Surname Book and Racial History
- History of the Young Ladies' Mutual Improvement Association of the Church of Jesus Christ of Latter-day Saints

Gates had planned on writing a series about female members of the church, but did not publish more than two volumes.

==== Biography of Brigham Young ====
Brigham Young: Patriot, Pioneer, Prophet is considered by many to be Gates' most ambitious work. For years, Gates was encouraged by her family members to write a comprehensive biography of her father, Brigham Young. By the time Gates began to write the biography, Young had been dead for years. According to Cracroft's research presented in his thesis, Gates struggled to start the big project, describing her feelings towards the job as, "I feel just like a molehill trying to write about a mountain." To help, Leah, Gates' eldest daughter, co-authored the biography. Some publishers felt that the manuscript was too long and religious for the average reader to enjoy. Two years after completing the manuscript, the biography was published in parts in a Sunday newspaper in Britain. In order for it to be published, much of the religious preaching that Gates included in the book was removed because it was seen as "Mormon Propaganda." A couple of years later, the biography was published as a book in London in 1930.

While Gates did provide an intimate picture of what it was like to grow up in Brigham Young's household, Gates and her book were criticized for presenting a polished, idyllic description of Brigham Young. The biography paints Young in a very positive light, while other published biographies about him at the time showed positive and negative aspects of the prominent LDS Church leader. As Cracroft writes in his thesis, the idyllic description of Young and Mormonism was standard for Gates as she mostly wrote for fellow Latter-day Saints and that Gates did not intend to write the biography for academic purposes. Gates was aware that her choice of portrayal of Young would be met with criticism. In response to these criticisms Gates said, "It may be suggested that this intimate picture of Brigham Young contains no character shadows, but it is concerned only with the high lights of his virtues and kingly powers. This statement might be answered in his own way by allowing that his enemies have been so busy magnifying his faults that there is small need of his friends painting any personal shadows into the picture."

Gates begins the biography by describing aspects of Brigham Young's life such as how he discovered and joined the church, his path to leadership in the church, and his role in the church moving to the western United States. As the book goes on, Gates describes how the LDS Church grew under Young's leadership. According to Cracroft's thesis, Gates knew the topics in which her readers would be the most interested: polygamy and the Mountain Meadows Massacre. Gates described Young's role in those two events, but made it clear that he was not a sexual predator or a violent, blood-thirsty man.

==== Articles ====
While on a mission in Hawaii, Gates published an article about native Hawaiian dress. The article appeared in the July 1888 edition of Godey's Lady's Book. During her time in Hawaii, Gates also wrote articles that were published in the LDS-directed magazine Contributor and in Woman's Exponent.

In 1889, after returning from their first mission, Gates founded the Young Woman's Journal, a periodical targeted to adolescent Latter-day Saint women. In 1897, the journal was adopted by the Young Ladies' Mutual Improvement Association. Gates stepped down as editor of the Journal in 1900, after she asked for and was denied a raise based on increased subscriptions to the magazine. She continued to contribute occasionally until it ceased publication in 1929.

In 1915, Gates founded Relief Society Magazine, a periodical targeted at members of the Relief Society. The magazine became the official publication of the church's Relief Society, and Gates edited it until 1922.

Throughout her life, Gates had writings published in multiple non-Mormon journals, such as North American Review and Godey's Lady's Book. However, outside of the publications she founded, most of Gates' articles appeared in other LDS magazines such as the Juvenile Instructor, the official publication of the church's Sunday School.

==== Poems ====
Gates' poems include:

- "From a Mother to Her Babes"
- Hymn of the Mothers of Men"
- "What, When, Who?"
- "The House that Elizabeth Built"
- "A Love Lyric"
- "Reflections"
- "Life's Interludes"
- "Sunset"
- "Consecration"

==== Short stories ====
Some of Gates' published short stories include:

- "Aunt Fanny's Rocking Chair"
- "Worse Than Death"
- "Three Mormon Boys"
- "Which Path?"
- "Harry's Wife"
- "Why Helen Did Not Attend the Christmas Ball"
- "All is Well! All is Well!"
- "Whatsoever a Man Soweth"

==== Other works ====
Gates wrote a cantata about the life of Brigham Young. Music for the performance was composed by H.E. Giles, a professor at Brigham Young Academy. Gates' cantata was performed on June 4, 1890, at the Provo Opera House as part of celebratory events commemorating Brigham Young's birthday. Gates also wrote some plays, her longest one being "Dialogue from the Book of Mormon." Gates also turned some of her poems into songs.

==== Unpublished works ====
During the last fifteen years of her life, Gates worked on two writing projects that were never published: The History of Women and Lucy Bigelow Young.

==== Publications in the Relief Society Magazine ====
===== Articles =====
- "International Genealogical Congress at the Panama-Pacific Exposition". Relief Society Magazine. 2 (9): 388–402. September 1915.
- "Mothers in Israel". Relief Society Magazine. 3 (3): 123–148. March 1916.
- "Mothers of Our Leaders in Israel". Relief Society Magazine. 3 (5): 243–255. May 1916.
- "The Cliff Dwellers". Relief Society Magazine. 3 (11): 622–631. November 1916.
- "Reception at the McCune Home". Relief Society Magazine. 3 (12): 677–688. December 1916.
- "To Genealogical Students". Relief Society Magazine. 4 (2): 121. February 1917.
- "The Red Cross". Relief Society Magazine. 4 (9): 489–498. September 1917.
- "Mothers in Israel". Relief Society Magazine. 5 (1): 11–17. January 1918.
- "The Passing of Apostle Hyrum M. Smith". Relief Society Magazine. 5 (3): 125–127. March 1918.
- "Our Relief Society Stake Presidents". Relief Society Magazine. 5 (4): 186–189. April 1918.
- "Music". Relief Society Magazine. 5 (4): 195–197. April 1918.
- "Relief Society Work in the Missions". Relief Society Magazine. 5 (7): 365–388. July 1918.
- "The Temple in Jerusalem". Relief Society Magazine. 5 (8): 427–434. August 1918.
- "My Hero and Heroine: General Richard W. Young and His Wife Mrs. Minerva Richards Young". Relief Society Magazine. 7 (3): 147–148. March 1920.
- "Suffrage Won by the Mothers of the United States". Relief Society Magazine. 7 (5): 249–275. May 1920.
- "LDS Relief Society Class for Training Nurses' Aids". Relief Society Magazine. 7 (6–7): 375–389. July 1920.
- "Mrs. May Wright Sewell". Relief Society Magazine. 7 (9): 499–501. September 1920.
- "Sacred Vestments of Ancient People". Relief Society Magazine. 7 (9): 502–506. September 1920.
- "Church School Education". Relief Society Magazine. 8 (9): 496–502. September 1921.
- "A Memorable Journey to the Scenic Glories of Southern Utah". Relief Society Magazine. 8 (11): 616–632. November 1921.
- "Presiding Patriarchs of the Church". Relief Society Magazine. 9 (1): 3–7. January 1922.
- "President Charles W. Penrose". Relief Society Magazine. 9 (2): 63–68. February 1922.
- "Relief Society Beginnings in Utah". Relief Society Magazine. 9 (4): 184–196. April 1922.
- "Our Hymn Book". Relief Society Magazine. 9 (7): 349–356. July 1922.
- "Sketches of Representative Women of the Church of Jesus Christ of Latter-day Saints". Relief Society Magazine. 18 (5): 247–252. May 1931.
- "Sketches of Representative Women of the Church of Jesus Christ of Latter-day Saints". Relief Society Magazine. 18 (9): 495–498. September 1931.

===== Relief Society Conference =====
- "The April Conference: Officers' Meetings". Relief Society Magazine. 3 (6): 312–313. June 1916.
- "General Conference of the Relief Society". Relief Society Magazine. 3 (12): 673–674. December 1916.
- "General Conference of Relief Society: General Meetings: Morning Session". Relief Society Magazine. 4 (12): 673. December 1917.
- "Relief Society Conference Minutes". Relief Society Magazine. 6 (8): 437–440. August 1919.
- "Relief Society Conference Minutes". Relief Society Magazine. 6 (8): 453–459. August 1919.
- "Relief Society Conference: Biography and History". Relief Society Magazine. 19 (11): 656–657. November 1932.

===== Biography =====
- "Alexander Neibaur". Relief Society Magazine. 9 (3): 132–141. March 1922.

== Views ==
=== Polygamy ===
Gates has been reported to hold differing views on polygamy throughout her life. As a daughter of Brigham Young, Gates grew up in one of the most prominent polygamous families in the United States at the time. Despite polygamy being practice in the church and Susa's idyllic recollections of growing up in a polygamist household, Gates reported that she was opposed to Jacob from taking another wife. However, Gates acknowledged that the practice of polygamy can be very difficult, but it can be lived harmoniously. When the church did away with the practice of polygamy, Gates felt that if Mormons had had more faith, the practice could have been continued. Years after the church ended practicing polygamy, Gates continued to defend it and verbally fought with people who opposed it.

Following the end of the church practicing polygamy, the church ideas of and culture regarding marriage and the romantic aspects of marriage began to change. At the same time, Mormon women were continuing to advocate for suffrage. As a result of these changes, prominent Mormon women had the opportunity to redefine womanhood in the church. In her thesis, Kathryn H. Shirts writes that "[Susa Young Gates and her daughter, Leah Dunford Widtsoe] fashioned a model for gender roles that has persisted among Mormons well into the twenty-first century." In 1939, Mormon apostle John A. Widtsoe (husband of Leah and son-in-law of Gates) published Priesthood and Church Government. According to Shirts, Leah and Gates' support of the book greatly influenced the popularity and acceptance of the book and its ideas."

Throughout her career, Gates faced criticism from other women, especially with suffragettes that Gates associated with, about polygamy. Gates wrote an article that was published in The North American Review in 1890 that defended the practice of polygamy. Gates used examples from her life, and particularly her childhood in Brigham Young's house, that she believed proved that polygamy was not an inherently harmful practice. She argued that children from polygamous families in Utah had many opportunities for education, including her own experience studying music and theatre. She described growing up in a polygamous household as desirable and idyllic, recounting the family traditions of "evening prayer" and time spent talking as a family as "pleasant." Gates writes that she rarely left the house for recreational activities because she had so many siblings to play with. She claimed that polygamy forces its participants to be more kind and gentle, and is better for society. She writes: "Statistics will bear me our in saying that there are fewer paupers, fewer criminals, fewer insane among polygamous than among monogamous families. It is a well-known fact here in Utah that there are fewer physical defects and greater intelligence in plural homes than in the same grade or class in monogamy."

=== Progressive homemaking ===
Gates promoted the idea that Shirts refers to as "progressive homemaking." Gates created and supported university classes on domestic science. She also sent Leah to the school of domestic science at the Pratt Institute of Brooklyn (now known as the Pratt Institute) following her graduation from the University of Utah. Gates also founded domestic science classes at BYU. Shirts reports that Gates and her daughter were on the "cutting edge of the national movement to make scientific homemaking an acceptable academic profession under the name home economics. Shirts argued that Gates' belief that women were divinely appointed to work in the home came from the Bible and that this idea was common in nineteenth-century America. Throughout her life and career, Gates defended the Biblical and traditional subordination of wives to their husbands. Shirts argues that the work that Gates did to promote those ideals made her standout among women of her time as many women were not actively involved in politics as Gates was. Gates spent much of her adult life promoting the importance of teaching homemaking as vital skill." According to Shirts' thesis, Gates also influenced how Mormons in her time viewed the relationship between husband and wife." Gates and her daughter promoted the idea that marriages are happiest when husband and wife act as "companions." Gates encouraged women to become educated because she believed that intelligent women were the most successful homemakers.

=== Women and the priesthood ===
Shirts' thesis also describes how Gates resolved her questions about the church's gender separation regarding the priesthood. Shirts reports that Gates spoke with Joseph F. Smith, her long-time friend and church leader, about her concerns. Gates later wrote about some of her interactions with Smith and how they affected her conclusions about the status of women in the church and the female relationship to the priesthood. Gates recorded some specifics of what Smith said, but her main conclusion from their conversations was that the gender hierarchy based on gender difference was natural and of divine creation. Gates reported that she did not find that conclusion offensive. Gates wrote, "in regard to woman's relationship to the priesthood I was perfectly satisfied -nay more- womanhood was glorified for me." Gates later explained that she viewed the female privilege of motherhood as a "spiritual parallel to priesthood." Gates promoted her conclusion and advocated for women to be submissive to male leaders and to focus on their work in the home. Shirts argues in her thesis that Gates promotion of this idea greatly affected the gender roles in the church. During her time in leadership positions in the church and affiliated institutions, Gates explained multiple times that "women do not hold the Priesthood."

== Personal life ==
=== Marriage and children ===
Gates most likely began being courted by different men when she was fourteen. Gates' father had an active role in the courtships of his children and would often interview the young men who came to visit his daughters and strongly encouraged his daughters to not associate with people who were not members of the LDS Church.

==== Marriage to Alma B. Dunford ====
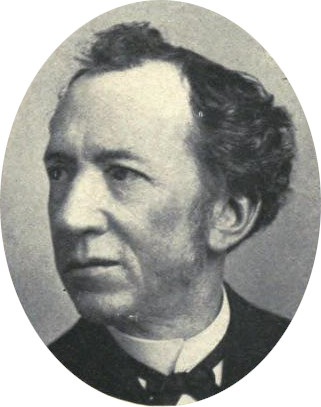
Alma B. Dunford, Gates's first husband

In 1872, while living in St. George, Gates married Alma B. Dunford. Gates was sixteen years old at the time of their marriage. The couple received permission from Brigham to be married in the Endowment House in Salt Lake City and they were married on December 1. Their marriage was performed by Gates' friend and future president of the church Joseph F. Smith. Dunford was a cousin of Young's brother-in-law and worked as a dentist. After they were married, they moved to Salt Lake City where Dunford opened up a dentist office. Together, the couple had two children, Bailey and Leah. Following the birth of their second child, the family moved back to St. George and began to build a house. Dunford reportedly drank, which caused her to be unhappy in the marriage. Before their house was completed, Dunford received a mission call to England. The family moved back to the Lion House in Salt Lake City while Dunford was in England. Following Dunford's departure, Gates and her children moved to Bloomington, Idaho to live with Dunford's parents. Shortly after they arrived in Idaho, Brigham died.

Gates decided that she wanted to end her marriage to Dunford and sent him a letter saying so. Still a missionary in England, Dunford was shocked and hurt to find out that Gates wanted to divorce. Dunford returned from England and the couple appeared in court to determine the specifics of their divorce. The relationship was so contentious that Gates ended up being arrested and briefly incarcerated for a fight she had with Dunford over the division of property following their divorce. Gates and Dunford officially divorced in 1877. Gates gained custody over their son, Bailey, while Dunford gained custody of Leah. Following the divorce, Gates was "devastated" by being separated from her daughter and faced with financial obligations that she could not afford. Gates did not receive alimony from the divorce, increasing her financial difficulties.

==== Marriage to Jacob F. Gates ====
A few years after the end of her first marriage, Gates began a relationship with Jacob F. Gates. Gates had met and become friends with Jacob while living in St. George. The two exchanged letters while Jacob was living in Hawaii as a missionary for the church. In these letters, Jacob invited Gates to visit him in Hawaii. Gates accepted his invitation and spent much of her six-week trip with Jacob. They continued their correspondence and were married three months after Jacob returned from Hawaii on January 5, 1880, in the St. George Utah Temple. They lived in St. George during the beginning of their marriage. In their first five years as a married couple, Gates gave birth to four children. Bailey, Gates' son from her previous marriage, enjoyed a close relationship with his new stepfather. While the family gained prominence in their community, they struggled financially for their whole life.

During their marriage, Gates and Jacob lived in Hawaii as missionaries for the church. Their biological children also came to Hawaii with them. In total, Gates and Jacob had eleven children, seven of which did not survive to adulthood.

=== Children ===
Throughout her life, Gates gave birth to thirteen children.

- Bailey
- Leah
- Emma Lucy (November 5, 1880)
- Jacob Young (1886)
- Karl Nahum (1883)
- Simpson Mark (1885)
- Joseph Sterling (1886)
- Brigham Cecil (1887)
- Harvey Harris (Hal) (1889)
- Sarah Beulah (1891)
- Franklin Young (1893)
- Heber (1894, died at birth)
- Brigham Young (1896)

While Gates was estranged from her children from her first marriage for a time, she did reconnect with Leah and Bailey after her time in Hawaii.

Since Dunford was given custody of Leah after the divorce, Gates was not able to spend much time with Leah when she was a child. From the divorce until a few years after Gates returned from Hawaii, Leah did not communicate much with Gates and Gates's family. As she grew older, Leah spent more time with Gates and her family. Gates was involved in the selection of Leah's husband. Gates introduced the couple, but then resisted their engagement. However, her future son-in-law communicated with Gates through letters and eventually earned her approval."

The relationship between Gates and Bailey struggled while Bailey lived with his father. While a teenager, Bailey expressed that he did not care to communicate with Gates. Eventually, Bailey asked Gates if he could live with her. Upon his return to Provo, Bailey continued to live a "troubled life." He left Provo and his family did not hear from him for several years. Bailey ended up traveling around the western United States, working odd jobs to earn money. During this time, he asked for and received some money from Gates. Bailey had strained relations with other members of his family due to unpaid debts and his struggles with alcohol abuse which greatly concerned Gates. On January 16, 1895, Bailey was killed as he was working as a firefighter. After the recovery of his body, it was discovered that the only possession he had with him was Gates' last letter to him. At the time of Bailey's funeral, Gates was bedridden following a difficult childbirth and consequently was not able to attend.

== Missionary experiences ==
=== Hawaii ===
Jacob received another mission call to Hawaii and requested and received permission for his family to come too. Gates, Jacob, and their children all lived in Hawaii as missionaries for the church. Before they left, Gates and Jacob attempted to receive for permission for Susa's son, Bailey, to come to Hawaii with them. This upset Gates' ex-husband, Dunford, who went to the courts and Gates was forced to give him full custody of Bailey. Bailey and Gates were devastated that they had to be separated and said goodbye to each other shortly before Gates left for Hawaii. Gates, Jacob, and their three surviving biological children arrived in Hawaii on November 10, 1885.

Gates and her family lived in La'ie, which at the time was a large plantation that offered only basic living conditions. The beginning of this mission was very hard for Gates as she greatly missed Bailey and her house was filled with vermin and mosquitoes. Gates did many things on the island to help the mission, including sewing, mending, cooking, baking, washing clothes, ironing, making butter, caring for the house and yard, cleaning, making preserves and soap, and whitewashing and painting. During this time, Gates gave birth to three more children. Together, the family helped out at the nearby sugar factory and raised chickens and cows. They also participated in church events. During this mission, some of Gates' children died from diseases. Despite Jacob being fluent in Hawaiian, there were often misunderstandings between the American Mormons and the native Hawaiians. These disagreements often stemmed from the amount of money that the Gates family spent. Knowing she had a "sharp tongue and occasional tendency to gossip," Susa also clashed with native Hawaiians and non-natives which cased disagreements. Gates included stories and details about her experience in her book, The Little Missionary.

During this mission, Bailey was living with his father. This put a strain on the relationship between him and Gates. Gates attempted to continue and strengthen the relationship by writing letters to Bailey, but Baily had formed a strong relationship with his father and did not have much interest in writing to Gates. Gates's other child from her previous marriage, Leah, had not seen her mother for many years since she lived with her father and thus did not have much of relationship with Gates. The separation and breakdown of relationships with her children greatly pained Gates.

On April 14, 1889, the Gates family left Hawaii to return to the United States, finishing their four-year mission.

=== United States ===
In March 1903, Gates received a mission call from the church to be a missionary in the United States.

== Death and legacy ==
Gates continued to work on many projects and different church assignments up to her death. Gates became ill with influenza around six weeks before her death. Gates died on the morning of May 27, 1933. When she died, Gates' living posterity included five children, fifteen grandchildren, and three great-grandchildren. Two days after her death, Gates' funeral was held at the Assembly Hall on Temple Square in Salt Lake City. Many members of Gates' family and prominent members of the church attended the funeral.

Over forty years after Gates' deaths, the American Mothers Committee selected Gates as the "most outstanding mother in Utah history."

== See also ==
- Descendants of Brigham Young
- Maud Babcock, the first woman on the University of Utah faculty
- Mormon feminism

Non-profit organization positions
Preceded by Maria Young Dougall	4th President of the Daughters of the Utah Pioneers; June 3, 1905–September 15, 1908	Succeeded by Isabell Whitney Sears
Relief Society Magazine titles
First	Editor; 1915–1922	Succeeded by Alice Louise Reynolds
