= Osborne J. P. Widtsoe =

American academic and missionary (1877–1920)

Osborne J.P. Widtsoe
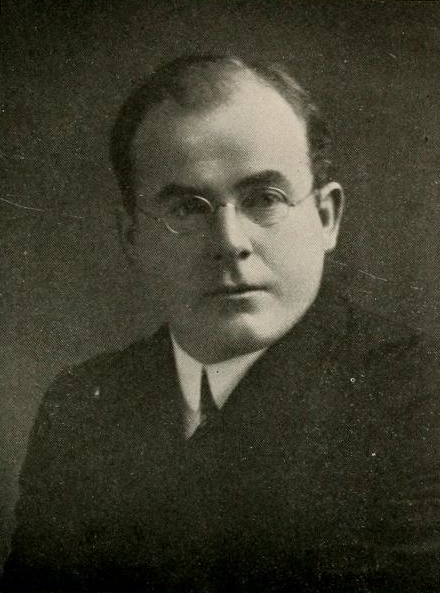
- Born: December 12, 1877; Namsos, Norway
- Died: March 14, 1920 (aged 42); Salt Lake City, Utah
- Known for: First LDS church missionary in Rarotonga

Osborne John Peder Widtsoe (December 12, 1877 – March 14, 1920) was principal of the Latter-day Saints University in Salt Lake City, Utah and a professor of English at the University of Utah. He was also the first missionary of the Church of Jesus Christ of Latter-day Saints (LDS Church) to serve in Rarotonga.

== Biography ==
Widtsoe was born in Namsos, Norway; he was the brother of John A. Widtsoe. He was baptized into the LDS Church in 1886 in Utah Territory. From 1897 to 1901, Widtsoe served as Mormon missionary in the Society Islands and in the Cook Islands, including Rarotonga. The Cook Islands has since issued a stamp featuring Widtsoe.

Widtsoe married Rosetta Homer and they had at least two children.

Widtsoe received his bachelor's degree from what is now Utah State University and his master's degree from Harvard University. He had also been a student at Brigham Young College in Logan, Utah. At the time of his appointment as head of the English Department at the University of Utah he was also serving as a bishop in the LDS Church.

Widtsoe also served for a time as assistant editor of the LDS Church publication Juvenile Instructor.

At the time of his death, Widtsoe was serving on the general board of the Young Men's Mutual Improvement Association.

== Publications ==
In addition to his own writings, Widtsoe worked with Albert E. Bowen and Franklin S. Harris in compiling the sermons and writings of Joseph F. Smith into the book Gospel Doctrine.

The following is a list of Widtsoe's own writings:

- Widtsoe, Osborne J. P. (1912). The Restoration of the Gospel. Salt Lake City: Deseret News Press.
- —— (1914). "The Schools of the Mormon Church". Report of the Commissioner of Education. 1. Washington D.C.: Government Printing Office: 409–413.
- —— (1917). What Jesus Taught. Salt Lake City: Deseret Sunday School Union.
- ——; B. Roland Lewis (1920). Community of Impression: A Manual of English Prose Composition. Salt Lake City: University of Utah Press.
- —— (1920–1921). A Guide for the Study of Gospel Doctrine. Salt Lake City, Utah.
- ——; B. Roland Lewis (1923). Effective Writing. New York, Chicago: C. Scribner's Sons.
