= Leah D. Widtsoe =

American missionary (1874–1965)

Leah Eudora Dunford Widtsoe
- Born: February 24, 1874; Salt Lake City, Utah
- Died: June 8, 1965 (aged 91); Salt Lake City, Utah
- Spouse: John A. Widtsoe

Leah Eudora Dunford Widtsoe (February 24, 1874 – June 8, 1965) was the wife of John A. Widtsoe, an apostle of the Church of Jesus Christ of Latter-day Saints. She was a prominent figure in home economics education and co-authored several books. She was also a missionary for the church and also served as the leader of all woman's auxiliaries in Europe when her husband was presided as mission president.

== Biography ==
=== Early life ===
Born Leah Eudora Dunford on Feb 24, 1874 in Salt Lake City, Utah, Leah was the daughter of Susa Young (later Susa Young Gates) and her then husband Alma Dunford, a dentist. Susa was a daughter of Brigham Young. After her parents divorced Leah was raised by her father. When she was in her teens she moved to live with her mother and her stepfather, Jacob Gates.

=== Education and marriage ===
Dunford had many educational opportunities. She spent a summer term at Harvard University in 1893. She attended the University of Utah, where she graduated as the Valedictorian of her class at the University of Utah Normal School in 1896. She also studied economics at the Pratt Institute in 1897, and spent some time studying at Brigham Young Academy. In 1897, she began teaching domestic science at the Academy (now Brigham Young University). She received a bachelor's degree in pedagogy from BYU in 1898, and was later awarded an Honorary Doctor of Humanities degree in 1960.

It was at Harvard that she met John A. Widtsoe, who would become her husband. On June 1, 1898, Dunford and Widtsoe were married in the Salt Lake Temple and she then went to Germany with him while he studied chemistry at the University of Göttingen. Their first child, Anne Gaarden Widtsoe, was born in Germany. The couple went on to have eight children, but only three lived to adulthood.

=== Career and contributions ===
As a teacher at Brigham Young University, Widtsoe was appointed the head of the Department of Domestic Sciences in 1897. She created new classes and course materials, incorporating what she had learned from her studies in the East, and emphasizing farm science. Her husband was president of Utah State University and Leah Widtsoe was the first lady from 1907 to 1916. She was also the first lady of the University of Utah when her husband was president from 1916 to 1921.

Widtsoe believed that homemaking and raising children were the most important professions she could have. She wrote pamphlets and articles on homemaking. She was a regular contributor to many LDS Church periodicals, like the Young Woman's Journal, The Relief Society Magazine, and The Improvement Era. Widtsoe was the co-author with her husband of The Word of Wisdom: A Modern Interpretation In addition, she was involved in writing The Life Story of Brigham Young with her mother.

Widtsoe was active in advocating her ideas on the role of women. When her family moved to Logan, Utah in 1900, Widtsoe sought to improve the lives of farmers' wives. She accompanied her husband when he went to visit with farmers, and talked to their wives about food, housecleaning, and health. She was instrumental in the passing of the Smoot Bill, which provided funds to states for research in home economics. She organized the first Agricultural College Women's Institute in 1903. She was one of the founders of the Salt Lake City Federation of Women Voters, and was president from 1919 to 1921. She also participated in the Salt Lake Council of Women, the National League of Pen Women and the Women's Legislative Council. In 1923, she attended the National Home Economics Movement Conference as the Utah representative.

Widtsoe was an active member of The Church of Jesus Christ of Latter-day Saints throughout her life. Her husband was called to the Quorum of the Twelve. In 1928, he was called on a mission to preside over the European Mission. She accompanied him to Europe, where they remained until 1933.

=== Later life ===
After returning from their mission in Europe, the Widtsoes published The Word of Wisdom: A Modern Interpretation. This book was later incorporated into the church's teachings in 1938.

She continued advocating women's rights and gave a number of lectures on homemaking and health. In 1958, she was elected to the Salt Lake Council of Women's hall of fame for her contributions.

Widtsoe died on June 8, 1965, in her home in Salt Lake City.

The Joseph F. Smith Family Living Center at BYU had a room named for Leah Widtsoe. Her papers relating to her education and teaching are held at BYU. Utah State University has a graduate scholarship in its Family, Consumer and Human Development program named after her.

== Publications ==
- The Word of Wisdom: A Modern Interpretation with her husband, John Widtsoe (1938)
- Labor Saving Devices for the Farm Home (1911)
- The Story and Live of Brigham Young with her mother, Susa Young Gates (1930)
- How to Be Well: A Health Handbook and Cookbook Based on the Newer Knowledge of Nutrition by a Member of the Mormon Church with John Widtsoe (1943)
- Brigham Young: The Man of the Hour with John Widtsoe (1947)

== See also ==
- Descendants of Brigham Young
