= LeRoy E. Cowles =

6th President of the University of Utah
- In office 1941–1946
- Preceded by: George Thomas
- Succeeded by: A. Ray Olpin

Personal details
- Born: April 13, 1880 Chester, Utah, U.S.
- Died: January 2, 1957 (aged 76) Orem, Utah, U.S.

LeRoy E. Cowles (April 13, 1880 - January 2, 1957) was an American academic administrator. He served as the president of the University of Utah from 1941 to 1946.
