= A. Ray Olpin =

American university president (1898–1983)

7th President of the University of Utah
- In office 1946–1964
- Preceded by: LeRoy E. Cowles
- Succeeded by: James C. Fletcher

Personal details
- Born: June 1, 1898 Pleasant Grove, Utah
- Died: March 7, 1983 (aged 84) Salt Lake City, Utah
- Spouse: Elvira
- Children: Virginia, Helen, Barbara, Howard, other daughter ("Shinobu")
- Education: Brigham Young University; Columbia University

Albert Ray Olpin (June 1, 1898 – March 7, 1983) was president of the University of Utah from 1946 to 1964. During his presidency the university quadrupled in size and enrollment tripled from 4,000 to 12,000 students. To accommodate these new pupils, new programmes such as Nursing and Fine Arts were organized.

== Biography ==
Olpin was the eldest son of eight children of Albert H. Olpin (who was severely beaten by a mob while serving on an LDS mission in South Carolina) and was raised in Pleasant Grove, Utah. He was accepted into the Brigham Young University business school at 16 years of age, but left school a year later to serve a four-year mission in Japan for the Church of Jesus Christ of Latter-day Saints. When Olpin returned he switched majors and graduated from Brigham Young University with bachelor's degrees in mathematics and physics in 1923. In 1930 he received a Ph.D. in physics from Columbia University.

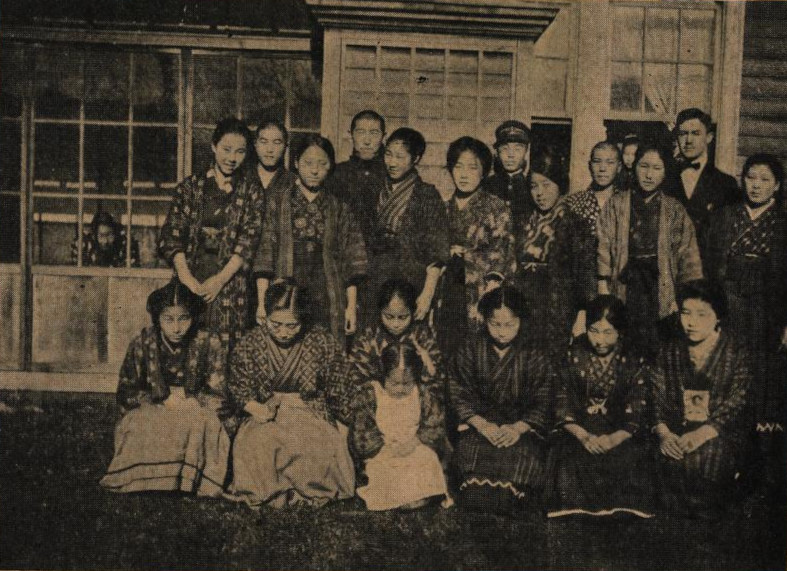
Olpin (in suit and bow tie in upper right) as instructor of a Sunday School class while serving a church mission in Japan

After completing his studies, Olpin worked at Bell Laboratories where he conducted research with Philo T. Farnsworth that led to the first television broadcast. Later, as president of the University of Utah, he granted Farnsworth a grant to establish television station KUED in Salt Lake City, Utah and Olpin was featured as the speaker on KUED's first broadcast. He also helped design the "Y" on the mountain overlooking the BYU campus. He directed research departments at Kendall Mills in North Carolina and at Ohio State University. On October 16, 1946, he became the seventh president of the University of Utah, continuing as such until his retirement in 1964, at which time he accepted the title of "President Emeritus" and continued working with the university as a consultant.

He also worked on the Manhattan Project that developed the first atomic bomb, and then helped in efforts to rebuild Japan after World War II. His efforts included creating the "Olpin Plan" (later renamed the "Peace Corps"), and the "Sister Cities" program (cultural exchange program between Japanese and U.S. cities of similar size). For many years after his death, the Japanese government sent delegations annually to lay flowers on his grave, to honor him.

Olpin died in Salt Lake City on March 7, 1983.

== University growth ==
Many of the buildings on campus today were built under President Olpin's administration. Olpin started a 10-year building program in which 30 buildings were completed, including the Milton Bennion Hall, the Merrill Engineering Building, and the A. Ray Olpin Union Building, which features a large portrait of him. Olpin worked to resolve challenges less frequently faced by larger, more established institutions, including defending academic freedom and educating local politicians about the potential for the University of Utah to become the state's flagship university.

Academic offices
Preceded by LeRoy E. Cowles	President of the University of Utah; 1946–1964	Succeeded by James C. Fletcher
