= Theta Alpha Phi =

American theatre honor fraternity

- ΘΑΦ
- Founded: December 1919; 106 years ago Chicago, Illinois
- Type: Honor
- Affiliation: Independent
- Status: Defunct
- Emphasis: Theatre
- Scope: National
- Motto: "The purpose of playing is...to hold, as 'twere, the mirror up to nature"
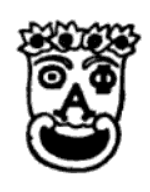
- Member badge
- Colors: Purple and White
- Symbol: Comedy and Tragedy masks
- Jewel: Ruby
- Publication: The Cue
- Chapters: 21
- Members: 23,000+ lifetime
- Nickname: Thetas, Thetans, TAPs, and Taffies
- Headquarters: 500 East Beechwold Boulevard; Columbus, Ohio 43214; United States
- Website: www.thetaalphaphi.com

Theta Alpha Phi National Theatre Honors Fraternity (ΘΑΦ) was an American honor society for theatre. It was established in 1919 by members of the National Association of Teachers of Speech. Membership was available to undergraduates and graduate students at member institutions.

As of 2024, Theta Alpha Phi appears to have ceased operations, leaving Alpha Psi Omega as the sole remaining national theatre honor society in the United States.

== History ==
Theta Alpha Phi was organized in December 1919 at a National Association of Teachers of Speech meeting in Chicago, Illinois. It was formed as an amateur dramatic society that would encourage interest in dramatics and bring together students, instructors, and alumni for social purposes.

Its first chapter, Oklahoma Alpha, was chartered on December 22, 1919 at Oklahoma A&M College, now Oklahoma State University in Stillwater, Oklahoma. By 1930, it had established 66 chapters and had initiated 4,212 members. However, many chapters went inactive during the Great Depression. In 1991, it had 54 active chapters and 32 inactive chapters, along with 22,800 initiates.

As of 2021, Theta Alpha Phi had 21 active chapters. The society's national headquarters was at 500 East Beechwold Boulevard in Columbus, Ohio. It was governed by an executive council and a national convention.

== Symbols ==
Theta Alpha Phi's motto is "The purpose of playing is...to hold, as 'twere, the mirror up to nature", which is a reference to the "advice to the players" speech in William Shakespeare's Hamlet.

The fraternity's gold badge is shaped like the comedy and tragedy masks, long associated with the theatrical arts. It is crowned with four rubies and bears the black enameled letters Θ, Α and Φ on the left eye, nose and right eye, respectively.

Its colors are purple and white. Its members are called Taffies, TAPs, Thetans, and Thetas.

== Activities ==
Theta Alpha Phi presented a national award called the Medallion of Honor, which it purported was the highest national tribute made in educational theatre. Theta Alpha Phi's magazine, The Cue, was established in 1922.

== Membership ==
Theta Alpha Phi is restricted to four-year or graduate colleges and universities and admits to membership only students of sophomore standing or above. Students become eligible after having successfully met a prescribed minimum of experience in directing, writing, acting in, or managing plays. Originally, this was specified as having performed two major or four minor roles or having demonstrated proficiency in another aspect of the dramatic arts.

== Chapters ==
Theta Alpha Phi has chartered at least 86 chapters and has 21 active chapters as of 2021.

== Notable members ==
- Maud Babcock, faculty member at University of Utah
- Ruth Moench Bell, a teacher at Utah Agricultural College
- Keene Curtis, actor
- Margaret Draper, actress
- Florence Kirk, opera singer
- Conrad Prebys, developer and philanthropist
- Eva Marie Saint, actress
