= Thomas Sederberg =

Thomas W. Sederberg is an emeritus professor of Computer Science at Brigham Young University in Provo, Utah. His research involved computer graphics and computer aided design. He helped invent free-form deformation and T-splines.

== Education and career ==
Thomas W. Sederberg studied civil engineering at Brigham Young University for both his Bachelor's (1975) and his Master's (1977) degrees. Sederberg received his PhD from Purdue and joined the civil engineering faculty at BYU in 1983. His PhD thesis discussed how to compute intersecting Bézier curves.

He is an associate editor for ACM Transactions on Graphics and for Computer Aided Geometric Design.

Sederberg co-founded T-Splines, inc. in 2004, which was acquired by Autodesk in 2011.

He was the associate dean of the college of physical and mathematical sciences at Brigham Young University from 2005 until his retirement in 2017.

== Awards ==
SIGGRAPH awarded Sederberg with the Computer Graphics Achievement award in 2006. In 2013 Sederberg received the Pierre Bézier award for his contributions to solid modeling.

Purdue gave Sederberg the Outstanding Mechanical Engineer Award in 2014. Brigham Young University awarded him the Steven V. White University Professorship, the Technology Transfer Award and the Distinguished Faculty Lecturer Award. His publications are highly cited—in 2014 Thomson Reuters named Sederberg as one of the 108 most-cited professors in computer science.

== Personal life ==
Sederberg married Brenda Clark in 1978, and they had eight children. One of them is Matthew Sederberg, CEO of Coreform, a successful software company.

== See also ==
- T-spline
- free-form deformation
