= Bézier =

Bézier can refer to:

- Pierre Bézier, French engineer and creator of Bézier curves
- Bézier curve
- Bézier triangle
- Bézier spline (disambiguation)
- Bézier surface
- The city of Béziers in France
- AS Béziers Hérault, a French rugby union team
- Bézier Games, an American board game publisher
