= Free-form deformation =

In computer graphics, free-form deformation (FFD) is a geometric technique used to model simple deformations of rigid objects. It is based on the idea of enclosing an object within a cube or another hull object, and transforming the object within the hull as the hull is deformed. Deformation of the hull is based on the concept of so-called hyper-patches, which are three-dimensional analogs of parametric curves such as Bézier curves, B-splines, or NURBs. The technique was first described by Thomas W. Sederberg and Scott R. Parry in 1986, and is based on an earlier technique by Alan Barr. It was extended by Coquillart to a technique described as extended free-form deformation, which refines the hull object by introducing additional geometry or by using different hull objects such as cylinders and prisms.

== Applications ==
- Free-Form Deformation is used in computer graphics for solid geometric models. For example, the Lattice Modifier in Blender (software).
- It is used in the image registration in both rigid and non-rigid transformation.
