= UNISURF =

Computer-aided design software

UNISURF was a pioneering surface CAD/CAM system, designed to assist with car body design and tooling. It was developed by French engineer Pierre Bézier for Renault in 1968, and entered full use at the company in 1975. One of the car parts developed with the assistance of UNISURF was the body of the Peugeot 204. By 1999, around 1,500 Renault employees made use of UNISURF for car design and manufacture.
