= I-spline =

In the mathematical subfield of numerical analysis, an I-spline is a monotone spline function.

An I-spline family of order three with four interior knots.

== Definition ==
A family of I-spline functions of degree k with n free parameters is defined in terms of the M-splines M_{i}(x|k, t)

$$I_i(x|k,t) = \int_L^x M_i(u|k,t)du,$$

where L is the lower limit of the domain of the splines.

Since M-splines are non-negative, I-splines are monotonically non-decreasing.

== Computation ==
I-splines of a given order can be derived from high-order M-splines.

Let j be the index such that t_{j} ≤ x < t_{j+1}, where the t_{j} are $(k + 1)$st-order M-spline knots. Then I_{i}(x|k, t) is zero if i > j, and equals one if j − k > i. Otherwise,

$$I_i(x|k,t) = \sum_{m=i + 1}^j (t_{m+k+1}-t_m)M_m(x|k+1,t)/(k+1).$$

Note that the equation given in is erroneous. The error and correct equations are discussed in the Praat and dms_variants documentation.

== Applications ==
I-splines can be used as basis splines for regression analysis and data transformation when monotonicity is desired (constraining the regression coefficients to be non-negative for a non-decreasing fit, and non-positive for a non-increasing fit).
