= M-spline =

In the mathematical subfield of numerical analysis, an M-spline is a non-negative spline function.

An M-spline family of order three with four interior knots.

== Definition ==
A family of M-spline functions of order k with n free parameters is defined by a set of knots t_{1} ≤ t_{2} ≤ ... ≤ t_{n+k} such that

- t_{1} = ... = t_{k}
- t_{n+1} = ... = t_{n+k}
- t_{i} < t_{i+k} for all i

The family includes n members indexed by i = 1,...,n.

== Properties ==
An M-spline M_{i}(x|k, t) has the following mathematical properties

- M_{i}(x|k, t) is non-negative
- M_{i}(x|k, t) is zero unless t_{i} ≤ x < t_{i+k}
- M_{i}(x|k, t) has k − 2 continuous derivatives at interior knots t_{k+1}, ..., t_{n−1}
- M_{i}(x|k, t) integrates to 1

== Computation ==
M-splines can be efficiently and stably computed using the following recursions:

For k = 1,

$$M_i(x|1,t) = \frac{1}{t_{i+1}-t_i}$$

if t_{i} ≤ x < t_{i+1}, and M_{i}(x|1,t) = 0 otherwise.

For k > 1,

$$M_i(x|k,t) = \frac{k\left[(x-t_i)M_i(x|k-1,t) + (t_{i+k}-x)M_{i+1}(x|k-1,t)\right]}{(k-1)(t_{i+k}-t_i)},$$

with the understanding that $M_{i}(x, k, t) = 0$ if $t_{i} = t_{i + k}$.

== Applications ==
M-splines can be integrated to produce a family of monotone splines called I-splines. M-splines can also be used directly as basis splines for regression analysis involving positive response data (constraining the regression coefficients to be non-negative).
