= De Boor's algorithm =

Method of evaluating spline curves

In the mathematical subfield of numerical analysis, de Boor's algorithm is a polynomial-time and numerically stable algorithm for evaluating spline curves in B-spline form. It is a generalization of de Casteljau's algorithm for Bézier curves. The algorithm was devised by German-American mathematician Carl R. de Boor. Simplified, potentially faster variants of the de Boor algorithm have been created but they suffer from comparatively lower stability.

== Introduction ==
A general introduction to B-splines is given in the main article. Here we discuss de Boor's algorithm, an efficient and numerically stable scheme to evaluate a spline curve $\mathbf{S}(x)$ at position $x$. The curve is built from a sum of B-spline functions $B_{i,p}(x)$ multiplied with potentially vector-valued constants $\mathbf{c}_i$, called control points,
$$\mathbf{S}(x) = \sum_i \mathbf{c}_i B_{i,p}(x).$$
B-splines of order $p + 1$ are connected piece-wise polynomial functions of degree $p$ defined over a grid of knots ${t_0, \dots, t_i, \dots, t_m}$ (we always use zero-based indices in the following). De Boor's algorithm uses O(p^{2}) + O(p) operations to evaluate the spline curve. Note: the main article about B-splines and the classic publications use a different notation: the B-spline is indexed as $B_{i,n}(x)$ with $n = p + 1$.

== Local support ==
B-splines have local support, meaning that the polynomials are positive only in a compact domain and zero elsewhere. The Cox-de Boor recursion formula shows this:
$$B_{i,0}(x) :=
\begin{cases}
1 & \text{if } \quad t_i \leq x < t_{i+1} \\
0 & \text{otherwise}
\end{cases}$$
$$B_{i,p}(x) := \frac{x - t_i}{t_{i+p} - t_i} B_{i,p-1}(x) + \frac{t_{i+p+1} - x}{t_{i+p+1} - t_{i+1}} B_{i+1,p-1}(x).$$

Let the index $k$ define the knot interval that contains the position, $x \in [t_{k},t_{k+1})$. We can see in the recursion formula that only B-splines with $i = k-p, \dots, k$ are non-zero for this knot interval. Thus, the sum is reduced to:
$$\mathbf{S}(x) = \sum_{i=k-p}^{k} \mathbf{c}_i B_{i,p}(x).$$

It follows from $i \geq 0$ that $k \geq p$. Similarly, we see in the recursion that the highest queried knot location is at index $k + 1 + p$. This means that any knot interval $[t_k,t_{k+1})$ which is actually used must have at least $p$ additional knots before and after. In a computer program, this is typically achieved by repeating the first and last used knot location $p$ times. For example, for $p = 3$ and real knot locations $(0, 1, 2)$, one would pad the knot vector to $(0,0,0,0,1,2,2,2,2)$.

== The algorithm ==
With these definitions, we can now describe de Boor's algorithm. The algorithm does not compute the B-spline functions $B_{i,p}(x)$ directly. Instead it evaluates $\mathbf{S}(x)$ through an equivalent recursion formula.

Let $\mathbf{d}_{i,r}$ be new control points with $\mathbf{d}_{i,0} := \mathbf{c}_{i}$ for $i = k-p, \dots, k$. For $r = 1, \dots, p$ the following recursion is applied:
$$\mathbf{d}_{i,r} = (1-\alpha_{i,r}) \mathbf{d}_{i-1,r-1} + \alpha_{i,r} \mathbf{d}_{i,r-1}; \quad i=k-p+r,\dots,k$$
$$\alpha_{i,r} = \frac{x-t_i}{t_{i+1+p-r}-t_i}.$$

Once the iterations are complete, we have $\mathbf{S}(x) = \mathbf{d}_{k,p}$, meaning that $\mathbf{d}_{k,p}$ is the desired result.

De Boor's algorithm is more efficient than an explicit calculation of B-splines $B_{i,p}(x)$ with the Cox-de Boor recursion formula, because it does not compute terms which are guaranteed to be multiplied by zero.

== Optimizations ==
The algorithm above is not optimized for the implementation in a computer. It requires memory for $(p + 1) + p + \dots + 1 = (p + 1)(p + 2)/2$ temporary control points $\mathbf{d}_{i,r}$. Each temporary control point is written exactly once and read twice. By reversing the iteration over $i$ (counting down instead of up), we can run the algorithm with memory for only $p + 1$ temporary control points, by letting $\mathbf{d}_{i,r}$ reuse the memory for $\mathbf{d}_{i,r-1}$. Similarly, there is only one value of $\alpha$ used in each step, so we can reuse the memory as well.

Furthermore, it is more convenient to use a zero-based index $j = 0, \dots, p$ for the temporary control points. The relation to the previous index is $i = j + k - p$. Thus we obtain the improved algorithm:

Let $\mathbf{d}_{j} := \mathbf{c}_{j+k - p}$ for $j = 0, \dots, p$. Iterate for $r = 1, \dots, p$:
$$\mathbf{d}_{j} := (1-\alpha_j) \mathbf{d}_{j-1} + \alpha_j \mathbf{d}_{j}; \quad j=p, \dots, r \quad$$
$$\alpha_j := \frac{x-t_{j + k - p}}{t_{j+1+k-r}-t_{j+k-p}}.$$
Note that j must be counted down. After the iterations are complete, the result is $\mathbf{S}(x) = \mathbf{d}_{p}$.

== Example implementation ==
The following code in the Python programming language is a naive implementation of the optimized algorithm.

def deBoor(k: int, x: int, t, c, p: int):
    """Evaluates S(x).

    Arguments
    ---------
    k: Index of knot interval that contains x.
    x: Position.
    t: Array of knot positions, needs to be padded as described above.
    c: Array of control points.
    p: Degree of B-spline.
    """
    d = [c[j + k - p] for j in range(0, p + 1)] 

    for r in range(1, p + 1):
        for j in range(p, r - 1, -1):
            alpha = (x - t[j + k - p]) / (t[j + 1 + k - r] - t[j + k - p]) 
            d[j] = (1.0 - alpha) * d[j - 1] + alpha * d[j]

    return d[p]

== See also ==
- De Casteljau's algorithm
- Bézier curve
- Non-uniform rational B-spline

== Computer code ==
- PPPACK: contains many spline algorithms in Fortran
- GNU Scientific Library: C-library, contains a sub-library for splines ported from PPPACK
- SciPy: Python-library, contains a sub-library scipy.interpolate with spline functions based on FITPACK
- TinySpline: C-library for splines with a C++ wrapper and bindings for C#, Java, Lua, PHP, Python, and Ruby
- Einspline: C-library for splines in 1, 2, and 3 dimensions with Fortran wrappers
