= Control point (mathematics) =

Points used to define the shape of curves and surfaces

In computer-aided geometric design a control point is a member of a set of points used to determine the shape of a spline curve or, more generally, a surface or higher-dimensional object.

For Bézier curves, it has become customary to refer to the $d$-vectors $\mathbf p_i$ in a parametric representation $\sum_i \mathbf p_i \phi_i$ of a curve or surface in $d$-space as control points, while the scalar-valued functions $\phi_i$, defined over the relevant parameter domain, are the corresponding weight or blending functions. Some would reasonably insist, in order to give intuitive geometric meaning to the word "control", that the blending functions form a partition of unity, i.e., that the $\phi_i$ are nonnegative and sum to one. This property implies that the curve lies within the convex hull of its control points. This is the case for Bézier's representation of a polynomial curve as well as for the B-spline representation of a spline curve or tensor-product spline surface.
