= Bézier spline =

Depending on the author, Bézier spline may refer to:

- a Bézier curve or
- a composite Bézier curve
