= De Casteljau's algorithm =

Method to evaluate polynomials in Bernstein form

In the mathematical field of numerical analysis, De Casteljau's algorithm is a recursive method to evaluate polynomials in Bernstein form or Bézier curves, named after its inventor Paul de Casteljau. De Casteljau's algorithm can also be used to split a single Bézier curve into two Bézier curves at an arbitrary parameter value.

The algorithm is numerically stable when compared to direct evaluation of polynomials. The computational complexity of this algorithm is $O(d n^2)$, where d is the number of dimensions, and n is the number of control points. There exist faster alternatives.

== Definition ==
A Bézier curve $B$ (of degree $n$, with control points $\beta_0, \ldots, \beta_n$) can be written in Bernstein form as follows
$$B(t) = \sum_{i=0}^{n}\beta_{i}b_{i,n}(t),$$
where $b$ is a Bernstein basis polynomial
$$b_{i,n}(t) = {n \choose i}(1-t)^{n-i}t^i.$$
The curve at point $t_0$ can be evaluated with the recurrence relation
$$\begin{align}
\beta_i^{(0)} &:= \beta_i, && i=0,\ldots,n \\
\beta_i^{(j)} &:= \beta_i^{(j-1)} (1-t_0) + \beta_{i+1}^{(j-1)} t_0, && i = 0,\ldots,n-j,\ \ j= 1,\ldots,n
\end{align}$$

Then, the evaluation of $B$ at point $t_0$ can be evaluated in $\binom{n}{2}$ operations. The result $B(t_0)$ is given by
$$B(t_0) = \beta_0^{(n)}.$$

Moreover, the Bézier curve $B$ can be split at point $t_0$ into two curves with respective control points:
$$\begin{align}
&\beta_0^{(0)},\beta_0^{(1)},\ldots,\beta_0^{(n)} \\[1ex]
&\beta_0^{(n)},\beta_1^{(n-1)},\ldots,\beta_n^{(0)}
\end{align}$$

=== Geometric interpretation ===
The geometric interpretation of De Casteljau's algorithm is straightforward.

- Consider a Bézier curve with control points $P_0, \dots, P_n$. Connecting the consecutive points we create the control polygon of the curve.
- Now, subdivide each line segment of this polygon with the ratio $t : (1-t)$ and connect the points you get. This way you arrive at the new polygon having one fewer segment.
- Repeat the process until you arrive at the single point – this is the point of the curve corresponding to the parameter $t$.

The following picture shows this process for a cubic Bézier curve:

Note that the intermediate points that were constructed are in fact the control points for two new Bézier curves, both exactly coincident with the old one. This algorithm not only evaluates the curve at $t$, but splits the curve into two pieces at $t$, and provides the equations of the two sub-curves in Bézier form.

The interpretation given above is valid for a nonrational Bézier curve. To evaluate a rational Bézier curve in $\mathbf{R}^n$, we may project the point into $\mathbf{R}^{n+1}$; for example, a curve in three dimensions may have its control points $\{(x_i, y_i, z_i)\}$ and weights $\{w_i\}$ projected to the weighted control points $\{(w_ix_i, w_iy_i, w_iz_i, w_i)\}$. The algorithm then proceeds as usual, interpolating in $\mathbf{R}^4$. The resulting four-dimensional points may be projected back into three-space with a perspective divide.

In general, operations on a rational curve (or surface) are equivalent to operations on a nonrational curve in a projective space. This representation as the "weighted control points" and weights is often convenient when evaluating rational curves.

=== Notation ===
When doing the calculation by hand it is useful to write down the coefficients in a triangle scheme as
$$\begin{matrix}
\beta_0     & = \beta_0^{(0)}     &                   &         &               \\
&                     & \beta_0^{(1)}     &         &               \\
\beta_1     & = \beta_1^{(0)}     &                   &         &               \\
&                     &                   & \ddots  &               \\
\vdots      &                     & \vdots            &         & \beta_0^{(n)} \\
&                     &                   &         &               \\
\beta_{n-1} & = \beta_{n-1}^{(0)} &                   &         &               \\
&                     & \beta_{n-1}^{(1)} &         &               \\
\beta_n     & = \beta_n^{(0)}     &                   &         &               \\
\end{matrix}$$
When choosing a point t_{0} to evaluate a Bernstein polynomial we can use the two diagonals of the triangle scheme to construct a division of the polynomial
$$B(t) = \sum_{i=0}^n \beta_i^{(0)} b_{i,n}(t), \quad t \in [0,1]$$
into
$$B_1(t) = \sum_{i=0}^n \beta_0^{(i)} b_{i,n}\left(\frac{t}{t_0}\right)\!, \quad t \in [0,t_0]$$
and
$$B_2(t) = \sum_{i=0}^n \beta_i^{(n-i)} b_{i,n}\left(\frac{t-t_0}{1-t_0}\right)\!, \quad t \in [t_0,1].$$

== Bézier curve ==
A second order Bézier curve

A third order Bézier curve

A fourth order Bézier curve

When evaluating a Bézier curve of degree n in 3-dimensional space with n + 1 control points P_{i}
$$\mathbf{B}(t) = \sum_{i=0}^{n} \mathbf{P}_i b_{i,n}(t),\ t \in [0,1]$$
with
$$\mathbf{P}_i := \begin{pmatrix} x_i \\ y_i \\ z_i \end{pmatrix},$$
we split the Bézier curve into three separate equations
$$\begin{align}
B_1(t) &= \sum_{i=0}^{n} x_i b_{i,n}(t), & t \in [0,1] \\[1ex]
B_2(t) &= \sum_{i=0}^{n} y_i b_{i,n}(t), & t \in [0,1] \\[1ex]
B_3(t) &= \sum_{i=0}^{n} z_i b_{i,n}(t), & t \in [0,1]
\end{align}$$
which we evaluate individually using De Casteljau's algorithm.

== Example ==
We want to evaluate the Bernstein polynomial of degree 2 with the Bernstein coefficients
$$\begin{align}
\beta_0^{(0)} &= \beta_0 \\[1ex]
\beta_1^{(0)} &= \beta_1 \\[1ex]
\beta_2^{(0)} &= \beta_2
\end{align}$$
at the point t_{0}.

We start the recursion with
$$\begin{align}
\beta_0^{(1)} &&=&& \beta_0^{(0)} (1-t_0) + \beta_1^{(0)}t_0 &&=&& \beta_0(1-t_0) + \beta_1 t_0 \\[1ex]
\beta_1^{(1)} &&=&& \beta_1^{(0)} (1-t_0) + \beta_2^{(0)}t_0 &&=&& \beta_1(1-t_0) + \beta_2 t_0
\end{align}$$
and with the second iteration the recursion stops with
$$\begin{align}
\beta_0^{(2)} & = \beta_0^{(1)} (1-t_0) + \beta_1^{(1)} t_0      \\
\             & = \beta_0(1-t_0) (1-t_0) + \beta_1 t_0 (1-t_0) + \beta_1(1-t_0)t_0 + \beta_2 t_0 t_0 \\
\             & = \beta_0 (1-t_0)^2 + \beta_1 2t_0(1-t_0) + \beta_2 t_0^2
\end{align}$$
which is the expected Bernstein polynomial of degree 2.

== Implementations ==
Here are example implementations of De Casteljau's algorithm in various programming languages.

=== Haskell ===
deCasteljau :: Double -> [(Double, Double)] -> (Double, Double)
deCasteljau t [b] = b
deCasteljau t coefs = deCasteljau t reduced
  where
    reduced = zipWith (lerpP t) coefs (tail coefs)
    lerpP t (x0, y0) (x1, y1) = (lerp t x0 x1, lerp t y0 y1)
    lerp t a b = t * b + (1 - t) * a

=== Python ===
def de_casteljau(t: float, coefs: list[float]) -> float:
    """De Casteljau's algorithm."""
    beta = coefs.copy()  # values in this list are overridden
    n = len(beta)
    for j in range(1, n):
        for k in range(n - j):
            beta[k] = beta[k] * (1 - t) + beta[k + 1] * t
    return beta[0]

=== Java ===
public double deCasteljau(double t, double[] coefficients) {
    double[] beta = coefficients;
    int n = beta.length;
    for (int i = 1; i < n; i++) {
        for (int j = 0; j < (n - i); j++) {
            beta[j] = beta[j] * (1 - t) + beta[j + 1] * t;
        }
    }
    return beta[0];
}

=== Code example in JavaScript ===
The following JavaScript function applies De Casteljau's algorithm to an array of control points or poles as originally named by De Casteljau to reduce them one by one until reaching a point in the curve for a given t between 0 for the first point of the curve and 1 for the last one

function crlPtReduceDeCasteljau(points, t) {
    let retArr = [ points.slice () ];
	while (points.length > 1) {
        let midpoints = [];
		for (let i = 0; i+1 < points.length; ++i) {
			let ax = points[i][0];
			let ay = points[i][1];
			let bx = points[i+1][0];
			let by = points[i+1][1];
            // a * (1-t) + b * t = a + (b - a) * t
			midpoints.push([
				ax + (bx - ax) * t,
				ay + (by - ay) * t,
			]);
		}
        retArr.push (midpoints)
		points = midpoints;
	}
	return retArr;
}

For example,

var poles = [ [0, 128], [128, 0], [256, 0], [384, 128] ] 
crlPtReduceDeCasteljau(poles, .5)

returns the array

[ [ [0, 128], [128, 0], [256, 0], [384, 128 ] ],
  [ [64, 64], [192, 0], [320, 64] ],
  [ [128, 32], [256, 32]],
  [ [192, 32]]
]

which yields the points and segments plotted below:

Intermediate line segments obtained by recursively applying linear interpolation to adjacent points

== See also ==
- Bézier curve
- De Boor's algorithm
- Horner scheme to evaluate polynomials in monomial form
- Clenshaw algorithm to evaluate polynomials in Chebyshev form
