= Pierre Bézier =

French mathematician (1910–1999)

- Born: 1 September 1910; Paris, French Third Republic
- Died: 25 November 1999 (aged 89)
- Education: École Nationale Supérieure d'Arts et Métiers; École Supérieure d'Électricité; Université Pierre-et-Marie-Curie
- Known for: Bézier curve Bézier surface Computer-aided manufacturing UNISURF
- Awards: Steven A. Coons Award (1985)
- Scientific career
- Fields: Mathematics
- Workplaces: Renault; Conservatoire National des Arts et Métiers

Pierre Étienne Bézier (French pronunciation: [pjɛʁ etjɛn bezje]; 1 September 1910 – 25 November 1999) was a French engineer and one of the founders of the fields of solid, geometric and physical modelling as well as in the field of representing curves, especially in computer-aided design and manufacturing systems. As an engineer at Renault, he became a leader in the transformation of design and manufacturing, through mathematics and computing tools, into computer-aided design and three-dimensional modeling.

Bézier patented and popularized the Bézier curves and Bézier surfaces that are now used in most computer-aided design and computer graphics systems.

== Background ==
Born in Paris, Bézier was the son and grandson of engineers. He obtained a degree in mechanical engineering from the École nationale supérieure d'arts et métiers in 1930. He earned a second degree in electrical engineering in 1931 at the École supérieure d'électricité, and a doctorate in 1977 in mathematics from the Pierre-and-Marie-Curie University where he contributed to the study of parametric polynomial curves and their vector coefficients.

From 1968 to 1979 Bézier was Professor of Production Engineering at the Conservatoire National des Arts et Métiers.

He wrote four books and numerous papers, and received several distinctions including the Steven Anson Coons Award from the Association for Computing Machinery and an honorary doctorate from Technische Universität Berlin. He was an honorary member of the American Society of Mechanical Engineers and of the Société Belge des Mécaniciens, president of the Société des Ingénieurs et Scientifiques de France, Société des Ingénieurs Arts et Metiers, and one of the first Advisory Editors of Computer-Aided Design magazine.

With his family's consent, the Solid Modeling Association established The Pierre Bézier Award for Solid, Geometric and Physical Modeling and Applications in 2007.

== Bézier curve ==
The curve named after Pierre Bézier

Bézier popularized but did not actually create the Bézier curve—using such curves to design automobile bodies. The curves were first developed in 1959 by Paul de Casteljau using de Casteljau's algorithm, a numerically stable method to evaluate Bézier curves. The curves remain widely used in computer graphics to model smooth curves.

Bézier developed the notation, consisting of nodes with attached control handles, with which the curves are represented in computer software. The control handles define the shape of the curve on either side of the common node, and can be manipulated by the user, via the software.

Bézier curves were adopted as the standard curve of the PostScript language and subsequently were adopted by vector programs such as Adobe Illustrator, CorelDRAW and Inkscape. Most outline fonts, including TrueType and PostScript Type 1, are defined with Bézier curves.

== Renault ==
From 1933 to 1975 Bézier worked for Renault, where he would ultimately develop his UNISURF CAD CAM system.

He began his 42-year tenure at Renault as a Tool Setter. In 1934, Bézier became Tool Designer and in 1945 became Head of the Tool Design Office. As Director of Production Engineering in 1949, he designed the "transfer machines" that produced most of the mechanical parts for the Renault 4CV. The transfer machines were high-performance work tools designed to machine engine blocks. While imprisoned during WWII, Bézier developed and improved on the "automatic machine principle" introduced before the war by General Motors. The new "transfer station", with multiple workstations and electromagnetic heads (antecedents to robots), enabled different operations on a single part to be consecutively performed by transferring the part from one station to another.

In 1957, Bézier became Director of the Machine Tool Division, responsible for the automatic assembly of mechanical components and for the design and production of numerical control drilling and milling machines. Bézier began managing technical development at Renault in 1960. He retired from Renault in 1975.

== CAD ==
Bézier began researching CAD/CAM in 1960 while at Renault, focusing on the UNISURF system he developed for use with drawing machines, computer control, interactive free-form curves, surface design and 3D milling for manufacturing clay models and masters. UNISURF debuted in 1968 and has been in full use since 1975.

In 1985 he was recognized by ACM SIGGRAPH with a Steven A. Coons Award for his lifetime contribution to computer graphics and interactive techniques.

== See also ==
- Bézier triangle
