= Loop subdivision surface =

Subdivision surface derived from a triangular mesh

Loop subdivision of an icosahedron; refinement steps zero, one, and two

In computer graphics, the Loop method for subdivision surfaces is an approximating subdivision scheme developed by Charles Loop in 1987 for triangular meshes. Prior methods, namely Catmull-Clark and Doo-Sabin, focused on quad meshes.

Loop subdivision surfaces are defined recursively, dividing each triangle into four smaller ones. The method is based on a quartic box spline. It generates C^{2} continuous limit surfaces everywhere except at extraordinary vertices, where they are C^{1} continuous.

== See also ==
- Geodesic polyhedron
- Catmull-Clark subdivision surface
- Doo-Sabin subdivision surface
