= List of continuity-related mathematical topics =

In mathematics, the terms continuity, continuous, and continuum are used in a variety of related ways.

== Continuity of functions and measures ==
- Continuous function
- Absolutely continuous function
- Absolute continuity of a measure with respect to another measure
- Continuous probability distribution: Sometimes this term is used to mean a probability distribution whose cumulative distribution function (c.d.f.) is (simply) continuous. Sometimes it has a less inclusive meaning: a distribution whose c.d.f. is absolutely continuous with respect to Lebesgue measure. This less inclusive sense is equivalent to the condition that every set whose Lebesgue measure is 0 has probability 0.
- Geometric continuity
- Parametric continuity
- Smoothness

== Continuum ==
- Continuum (set theory), the real line or the corresponding cardinal number
- Linear continuum, any ordered set that shares certain properties of the real line
- Continuum (topology), a nonempty compact connected metric space (sometimes a Hausdorff space)
- Continuum hypothesis, a conjecture of Georg Cantor that there is no cardinal number between that of countably infinite sets and the cardinality of the set of all real numbers. The latter cardinality is equal to the cardinality of the set of all subsets of a countably infinite set.
- Cardinality of the continuum, a cardinal number that represents the size of the set of real numbers

== See also ==
- Continuous variable
