= ULTRAY2000 =

ULTRAY2000 is a concept chip for 3D graphics processing designed by Digital Media Professionals Inc. (DMP), a Japanese GPU design company. It was used for real-time 3D graphics. It was produced in 0.13 μm TSMC manufacturing process and contained more than 100 million CMOS transistors, with GPU core clock running at 200 MHz and its integrated memory controller having support for DDR-400 memory. DMP announced ULTRAY2000 concept chip on July 21, 2005, and its first exhibition was at SIGGRAPH 2005. The first sample shipments were scheduled for the fall of 2005. ULTRAY2000 adopted a design where a fixed graphics pipeline architecture coexists with an advanced instruction programmable core.

ULTRAY2000 features proprietary modelled algorithms for generating physical light reflection and shadow properties for various materials embedded on the visual processor chip as hardware specific features (“MAESTRO” technology). This feature gave the chip ability to process real-life looking 3D graphics at high resolution in real time.

It was succeeded by the PICA200.

== Specification ==
SIGGRAPH 2005's public exhibition card:

- Core clock 200 MHz produced in 130 nm TSMC process
- 256 MB DDR-400 SDRAM on 256-bit memory bus - 12.8 GB/s memory bandwidth
- PCI interface bus supporting both 64-bit/66 MHz and 32-bit/33 MHz cards
- Display outputs support with digital DVI-I and RGB analog Dsub-15 8DE-15/HD-15) connectors - only one display could be connected to output
- Support for OpenGL 2.0, OpenGL ES 2.0 and Java Mobile 3D Graphics for J2ME (JSR-000184) APIs - Mobile 3D Graphics for J2ME is more widely known as M3G 1.0/1.1 since 2007

NOTE: Exhibited part has not supported PCI Express bus because of high licensing fees, and the project's main business plan was focused on embedded platforms.

== DMP “MAESTRO” and “MAESTRO-2G” Technology ==
=== “MAESTRO” Technology ===
“MAESTRO” is a sophisticated technology developed by modeling various computer graphics algorithms for later hardware implementation on proprietary solutions so that they can be built on silicon as advanced graphics solutions based on customer demands.

“MAESTRO” technology features:

- Shading Maestro (previously known as Material Maestro) - bidirectional reflectance distribution function (BRDF), subsurface scattering (SSS), which enable fast eye-candy rendering with various combinations of light reflection modeling to run at a higher resolution
- Figure Maestro - figure processing technology that executes within the primitive processing, it includes geometry processing (Geometry Shader --"Geo Shader") and generating polygon subdivision (a.k.a. Tessellation)
- Shadow Maestro - shadow rendering enhancement which combines innovative shadow map generation method and shadow filtering process in generating shadow that applies to the final display space, and thus enable creation of beautiful partial soft-edged shadows and self shadows.
- Particle Maestro - providing support for high-quality rendering of fuzzy objects which needs specific particle projection, quickly drawing gaseous form objects and beautifully renders clouds, smoke, gas and other fuzzy objects
- Glare Maestro - hardware support for rendering lens flare and glare textures

=== “MAESTRO-2G” Technology ===
“MAESTRO-2G” technology is further refinement of previous “MAESTRO” generation focused on ability to render images at even higher resolutions by reducing processing contents size and memory bandwidth usage, and thus contributing to reducing energy consumption at the system level.

“MAESTRO-2G” technology additionally features:

- Mapping Maestro - rendering algorithms for embedded graphics systems based on the texture mapping (specifically bump mapping, cube mapping, multitexturing, etc.) and procedural texturing reduced contents size and memory bandwidth requirements an by that improves overall application performance and removes any notion about previously supported Glare Maestro feature.
