= Jos Stam =

Dutch computer scientist

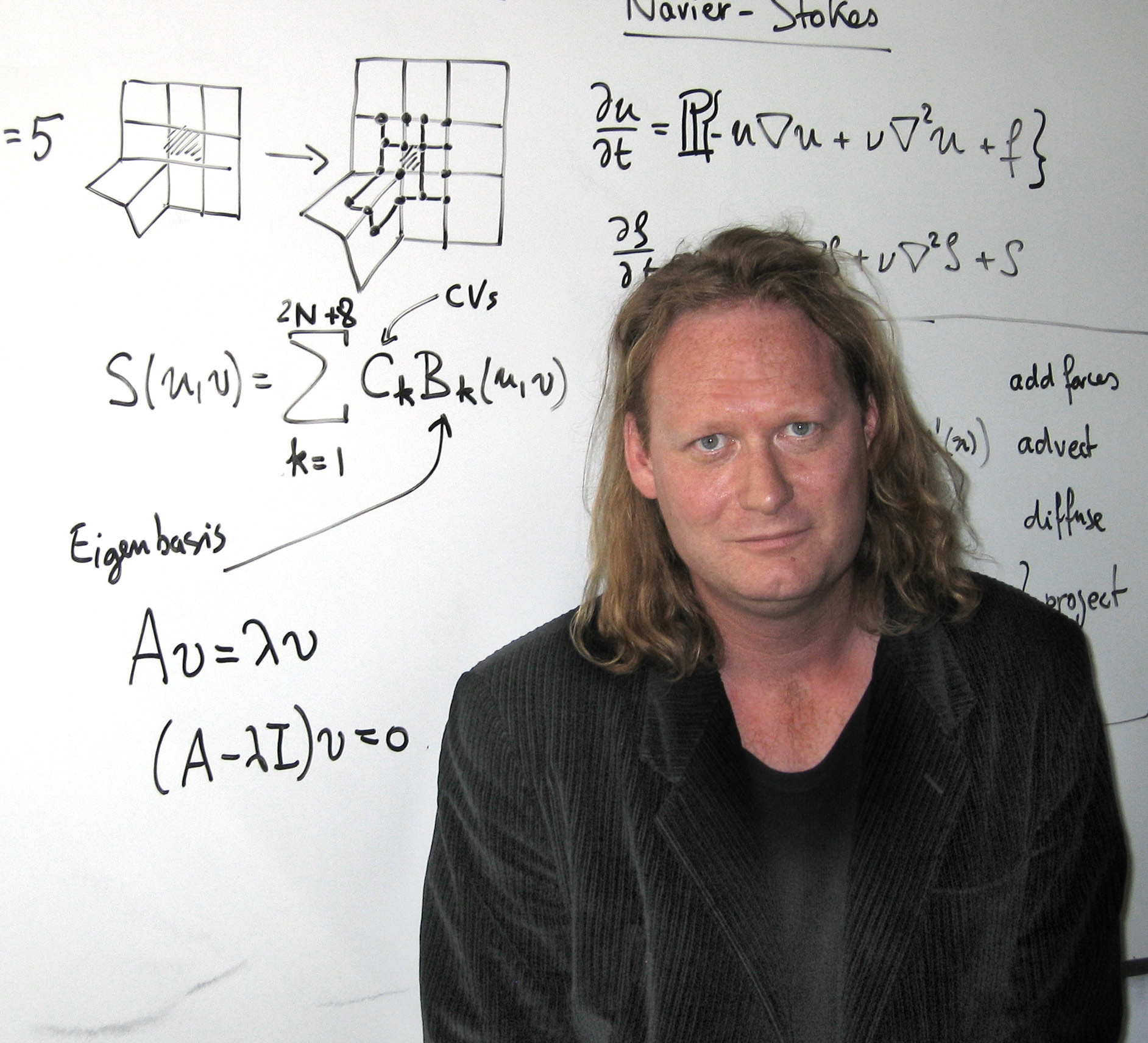
Jos Stam, 2005

Jos Stam (born 28 December 1965 in The Hague, Netherlands) is a researcher in the field of computer graphics, focusing on the simulation of natural physical phenomena for 3D-computer animation. He achieved technical breakthroughs with the simulation of fluids and gases, new rendering algorithms and subdivision surfaces, which are a mix between two previously incompatible worlds of Nurbs- and polygon-modeling in 3D.

== Education and career ==
Jos Stam's maternal grandfather was the Dutch politician Sim Visser. His father Jos Stam was born in Rotterdam (Netherlands), and in 1944 at the razzia of Rotterdam, he was deported by the Nazis to Germany, where he had to repair railroads behind the western front, until being liberated by the American troops in 1945. He emigrated to the US in 1956, where he worked as a researcher for the DuPont de Nemours Company. He became a US citizen in 1964. In the US he met his wife, Alida Wilhelmina Visser, born in Wassenaar (Netherlands). In early 1965, Jos' father was transferred by DuPont to Geneva, Switzerland, where Jos was born as their third child in December 1965.

Jos got his schooling in French at Geneva. In 1988 he received his bachelor's degree in computer science and a year later in pure mathematics, both at the University of Geneva, and his Masters and Ph.D. in computer science at the Dynamic Graphics Project at University of Toronto. After graduating, he held two postdoc positions, one at INRIA (in Paris, France) and one at VTT (in Helsinki, Finland).

He then joined SGI's Alias|wavefront division (which later spun out as Alias Systems Corporation) as a full-time researcher in Toronto and Seattle. He started with particle systems for the PowerAnimator software package. Then he made significant contributions to the fluids simulation component of Alias' Maya 3D content creation software product. As a result of Alias being acquired by Autodesk in early 2006, Stam became a "Senior Research Scientist" at Autodesk, Inc. in Toronto. Stam left Autodesk in 2018.

== Awards ==
- SIGGRAPH Computer Graphics Achievement Award (2005) for his contributions to the field of computer graphics
- Academy Award for Technical Achievement (2005) for his work on subdivision surfaces and their resulting impact in the film industry.
- Academy Award for Technical Achievement (2008) for the design and implementation of the Maya Fluid Effects system.
