= Parametric continuity =

Notion of smoothness for parametric curves

In computer graphics, the terms parametric continuity (C^{k}) and geometric continuity (G^{n}) were introduced by Brian Barsky, to show that the smoothness of a curve can be measured either with respect to a particular parametrization or after allowing changes in the speed with which the parameter traces out the curve.

== Parametric continuity ==
Parametric continuity (C^{k}) is a concept applied to parametric curves, which describes the smoothness of the curve as a function of its parameter. A (parametric) curve $s:[0,1]\to\mathbb{R}^n$ is said to be of class C^{k} if the derivatives of $s$ up to order $k$ exist and are continuous on $[0,1]$, where derivatives at the end-points $0$ and $1$ are taken to be one-sided derivatives (from the right at $0$ and from the left at $1$).

As a practical application of this concept, a curve describing the motion of an object with a parameter of time has C^{1} continuity when its velocity varies continuously, and C^{2} continuity when its acceleration varies continuously. For smoother motion, such as that of a camera's path while making a film, higher orders of parametric continuity may be required.

=== Order of parametric continuity ===
Two Bézier curve segments attached in a way that is only C^{0} continuous

Two Bézier curve segments attached in such a way that they are C^{1} continuous

The various orders of parametric continuity can be described as follows:

- $C^0$: zeroth derivative is continuous (curves are continuous)
- $C^1$: zeroth and first derivatives are continuous
- $C^2$: zeroth, first and second derivatives are continuous
- $C^n$: 0-th through $n$-th derivatives are continuous

== Geometric continuity ==
Curves with G^{1}-contact (circles,line)

$(1-\varepsilon^2) x^2 -2px+y^2=0 , \ p>0 \ , \varepsilon\ge 0$ pencil of conic sections with G^{2}-contact: p fix, $\varepsilon$ variable ($\varepsilon=0$: circle,$\varepsilon=0.8$: ellipse, $\varepsilon=1$: parabola, $\varepsilon=1.2$: hyperbola)

A curve or surface can be described as having $G^n$ continuity, with $n$ being an increasing measure of smoothness. Consider the segments on either side of a point on a curve:

- $G^0$: The curves touch at the join point.
- $G^1$: The curves also share a common tangent direction at the join point.
- $G^2$: The curves also share a common center of curvature at the join point.

In general, $G^n$ continuity holds when the curves can be reparameterized so that they have $C^n$ parametric continuity. A reparametrization of the curve is geometrically identical to the original; only the parameter is affected.

Equivalently, two vector functions $f(t)$ and $g(t)$ such that $f(1)=g(0)$ have $G^n$ continuity at the point where they meet if they satisfy equations known as Beta-constraints. For example, the Beta-constraints for $G^4$ continuity are:

$$\begin{align}
g^{(1)}(0) & = \beta_1 f^{(1)}(1) \\
g^{(2)}(0) & = \beta_1^2 f^{(2)}(1) + \beta_2 f^{(1)}(1) \\
g^{(3)}(0) & = \beta_1^3 f^{(3)}(1) + 3\beta_1\beta_2 f^{(2)}(1) +\beta_3 f^{(1)}(1) \\
g^{(4)}(0) & = \beta_1^4 f^{(4)}(1) + 6\beta_1^2\beta_2 f^{(3)}(1) +(4\beta_1\beta_3+3\beta_2^2) f^{(2)}(1) +\beta_4 f^{(1)}(1) \\
\end{align}$$

where $\beta_2$, $\beta_3$, and $\beta_4$ are arbitrary, but $\beta_1$ is constrained to be positive. In the case $n=1$, this reduces to $f'(1)\neq0$ and $f'(1) = kg'(0)$, for a scalar $k>0$ (i.e., the direction, but not necessarily the magnitude, of the two vectors is equal).

While it may be obvious that a curve would require $G^1$ continuity to appear smooth, for good aesthetics, such as those aspired to in architecture and sports car design, higher levels of geometric continuity are required. For example, class A surface requires $G^2$ or higher continuity to ensure smooth reflections in a car body.

A rounded rectangle (with ninety-degree circular arcs at the four corners) has $G^1$ continuity, but does not have $G^2$ continuity. The same is true for a rounded cube, with octants of a sphere at its corners and quarter-cylinders along its edges. If an editable curve with $G^2$ continuity is required, then cubic splines are typically chosen; these curves are frequently used in industrial design.
