= Product manager =

Professional role in business

A product manager (PM) is a professional role that is responsible for the development of products for an organization, known as the practice of product management. Product managers own the product strategy behind a product (physical or digital), specify its functional requirements, and manage feature releases. Product managers coordinate work done by many other functions (like software engineers, data scientists, and product designers), and are ultimately responsible for product outcomes.

== Definition ==
A product manager considers numerous factors such as the intended customer or user of a product, the products the competition offers, and how well the product fits with the company's business model. The scope of a product manager varies greatly, some may manage one or more product lines and others (especially in large companies) may manage small components or features of a product.

In the financial services industry (banking, insurance, etc.), product managers manage financial products (for example, credit card portfolios), their profit and loss, and also determine the business development strategy.

The term is often confused with other similar roles, such as:

- Project manager: may perform all activities related to schedule and resource management
- Program Manager, sometimes known as Technical Program Manager (TPM): may perform activities related to schedule, resource, and cross-functional execution
- Product owner: a popular role in Agile development methodology, may perform all activities related to a self-encapsulated feature or feature set plan, development, and releases
- Product marketing manager: responsible for the outbound marketing activities of the product, not development and cross-functional execution

== Product management in software development ==
The role of the product manager was created to manage the complexity of the product lines of a business, as well as to ensure that those products were profitable. Product managers can come from many different backgrounds because their primary skills involve working well with customers and understanding the problems the product is intended to solve.

A product manager is responsible for orchestrating the various activities associated with ensuring that a product is delivered that meets users' needs. A software product manager's role varies as the software moves through its lifecycle; earlier in the development process the product manager meets the intended audience of the product to engage in requirements elicitation, whereas later in the lifecycle the product manager's primary focus may be on acceptance testing of the product. Throughout all the stages of the product development process, the product manager represents the needs of end-users, evaluates market trends and competition, and uses this information to determine what features to build. For example, a product manager may decide a feature is needed because users are asking for it, or because the feature is needed to stay competitive. To facilitate this decision-making process the product manager may set out a vision for the product or a general framework for making product decisions. The product manager also ensures an atmosphere of cohesiveness and focused collaboration between all the members of the team, all in the interest of driving the product forward. Product managers are often thought of as sitting at the intersection of business, design, and technology.

=== Product owner in software development ===
Within an agile software development environment, product delivery responsibilities are taken on by a product owner, a project role that a product or engineering manager can perform to ensure the successful implementation of tactical plans and requirements during the development stage of a product. While the product manager has a strategic and long-term perspective with a strong focus on the market success of a product, a product owner aims to maximize the business value of the product or increment created by an agile project which can include benefits within an organization and does not explicitly relate to a product's marketability. Therefore, a product owner focuses mainly on developing a product and may limit their product owner's responsibilities to the duration of a project. The product manager role, in contrast, requires a long-term perspective of the market and product line.

The day-to-day responsibilities of a product owner within an agile project include creating and prioritizing the product backlog, which is a list of things to be done by the development team, to maximize the business value created by the project. The product backlog is made up of user stories which are brief narrative descriptions of what a feature should do, including a checklist of items that are required to be in place for the feature to be considered done, called the acceptance criteria. The details of how the feature is developed are worked out by developers and designers. At the end of the development sprint, the product owner is responsible for verifying that the acceptance criteria have been met; only then is the work on the feature officially done.

== Product manager career progression ==
Product managers often start their careers as engineers or specialists in other functions and eventually transition to product management. Product managers undergo a structured interview process, often a mix of case-based product strategy interviews, analytical interviews, and more traditional behavioral interviews. Increasingly, large technology companies are hiring and training young graduates directly through programs like the Google Associate Product Manager program or the Facebook Rotational Product Manager program.

Individual contributor product managers have no direct reports: they "lead through influence" in a cross-functional product team. As individuals grow in seniority, they eventually take on managing other PMs, under titles like Group Product Manager, Product Lead or Product Director. The Chief Product Officer (sometimes known as Head of Product or VP Product) is responsible for all product-related matters, including strategy, alignment, hiring, and management.

Because of the broad responsibilities, product management is often seen as a training ground for C-level leadership roles in technology companies.

== Notable individuals ==
Notable individuals who have held the role of product manager include:

- Sundar Pichai (CEO of Alphabet Inc.)
- Marissa Mayer (former CEO of Yahoo!)
- Premal Shah (president of Kiva.org)
- Reid Hoffman (founder of LinkedIn)
- Kevin Systrom (founder of Instagram)
- Satya Nadella (CEO of Microsoft)
- Neal Mohan (CEO of YouTube)
- Stewart Butterfield (CEO of Slack)
- Indra Nooyi (former CEO of PepsiCo)
- Ivan Zhao (founder of Notion)
- Sheila Lirio Marcelo (founder of Care.com)

== See also ==
- Product strategy
- Product management
- Product planning
- Product marketing
- Product requirements document
- Program director
- Collaborative Product Development
- New product development
- Marketing requirements document
