= Azuqua =

American cloud-based integration and automation company

- Industry: iPaaS
- Founded: 2011
- Founder: Nikhil Hasija & Craig Unger
- Headquarters: Seattle, Washington
- Website: https://azuqua.com/

Azuqua is an American cloud-based integration and automation company headquartered in Seattle, Washington. As such, they integrate SaaS applications and create automations that are designed to eliminate manual work. Azuqua's platform has the ability to set up workflows between multiple applications so disparate teams can stay in the loop. Azuqua's customers include companies such as Charles Schwab, General Electric, General Motors, HubSpot, and Airbnb.

== History ==
Nikhil Hasija and Craig Unger founded Azuqua in 2011.

In 2013, the team participated in Techstars Microsoft's Windows Azure Accelerator, a Seattle-based incubator that helps entrepreneurs gain traction through deep mentor engagement and rapid iteration cycles.

Azuqua announced in 2014 that they have received their Series A funding from Ignition Partners which amounted to $5 million.

2017 included a 65% growth in new customers, a doubling of new SaaS connectors, and a 50% growth in overall employee headcount. Azuqua also received their Series B funding which totaled to $10.8 million. This funding was led by Insight Ventures Partners, with DFJ and Ignition Partners also joining the round

In March 2018, Azuqua hired Todd Owens as CEO. Owens was previously CEO of Appuri, a customer data platform. Hasija has transitioned to the role of Chief Product Officer.

Azuqua also hired on Dan Kogan who has taken on the role of Chief Marketing Officer. Kogan previously worked at Tableau, a BI and analytics company, as a Senior Director of Product Marketing.

Okta acquired Azuqua in 2019.

== Product Description/Features ==
- Logic Library: Logic functions that can be used for data processing, branching logic, and business rules
- Drag and Drop Visual Designer: No-code visual designer
- Use of API's for each cloud service a business is using to allow the various apps to communicate and share data
- API Publishing: Integrations and automations can be made available as secure endpoints, webhooks, or open services
- Connector Builder: Build a connector to an application
- Connector Library: Pre-built connectors to SaaS applications
- Error Handling: Automations that execute when an error is detected
