= Automotive design =

Process of developing the design of motor vehicles

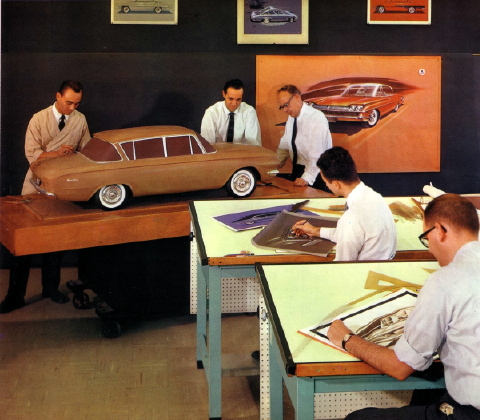
Designers at work in 1961. Standing by the scale model's left front fender is Dick Teague, an automobile designer at American Motors Corporation (AMC).

Automotive design is the process of developing the appearance (and to some extent the ergonomics) of motor vehicles, including automobiles, motorcycles, trucks, buses, coaches, and vans.

The functional design and development of a modern motor vehicle is typically done by a large team from many different disciplines also included within automotive engineering, however, design roles are not associated with requirements for professional- or chartered-engineer qualifications. Automotive design in this context focuses primarily on developing the visual appearance or aesthetics of vehicles, while also becoming involved in the creation of product concepts. Automotive design as a professional vocation is practiced by designers who may have an art background and a degree in industrial design or in transportation design. For the terminology used in the field, see the glossary of automotive design.

== Design elements ==
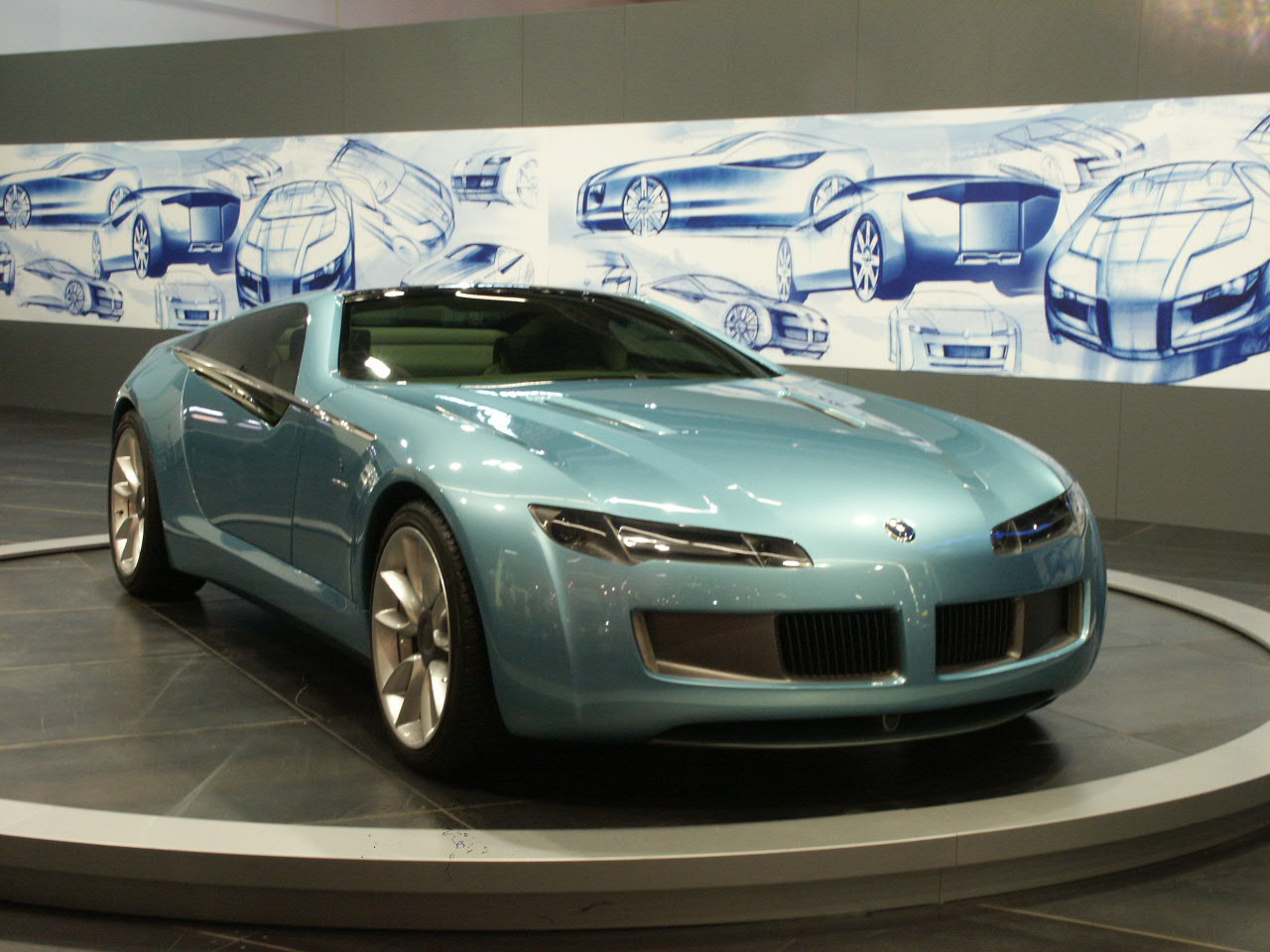
The 2003 Bertone Birusa concept car on display at the Geneva Motor Show. In the background are some concept sketches.

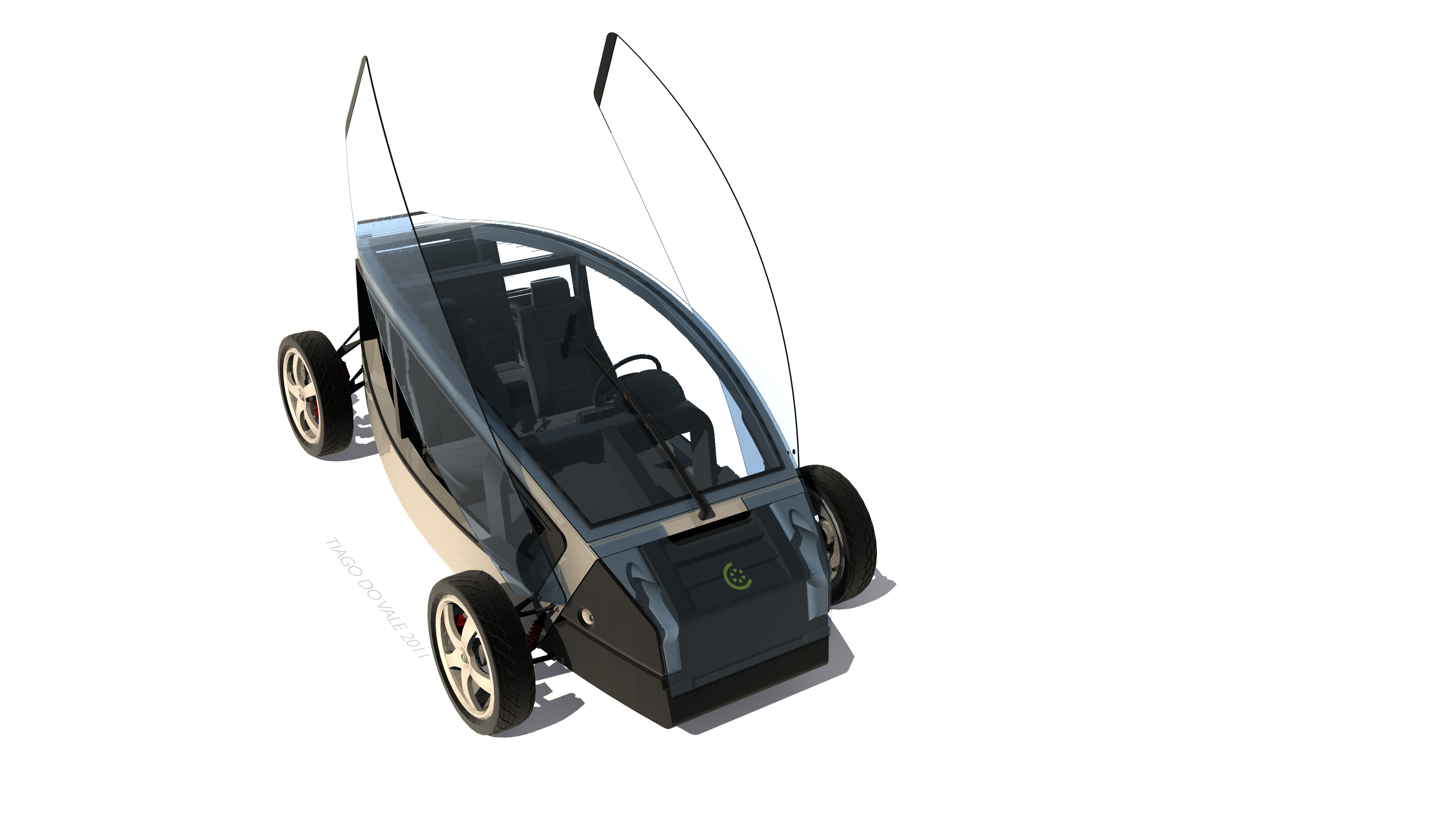
Draft of OScar design proposal

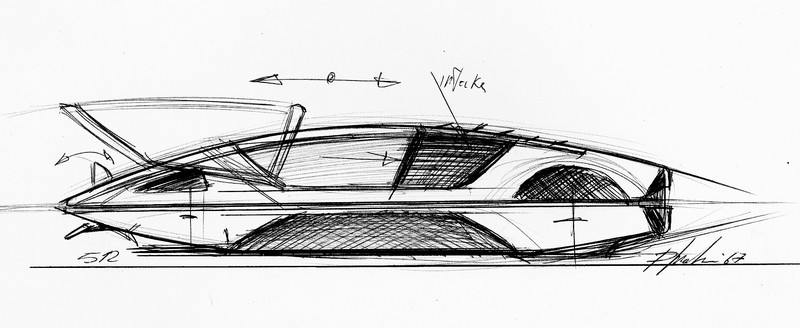
A futuristic original sketch for the Ferrari Modulo 512-S concept car by Paolo Martin in 1967. There are already many features of the final product, including the reduced height, wheels coved for low drag, and the characteristic entry system.

The task of the design team is usually split into three main aspects: exterior design, interior design, and color and trim design. Graphic design is also an aspect of automotive design; this is generally shared amongst the design team as the lead designer sees fit. The design focuses not only on the isolated outer shape of automobile parts, but concentrates on the combination of form and function, starting from the vehicle package.

The aesthetic value will need to correspond to ergonomic functionality and utility features as well. In particular, vehicular electronic components and parts will give more challenges to automotive designers who are required to update on the latest information and knowledge associated with emerging vehicular gadgetry, particularly dashtop mobile devices, like GPS navigation, satellite radio, HD radio, mobile TV, MP3 players, video playback, and smartphone interfaces. Though not all the new vehicular gadgets are to be designated as factory standard items, some of them may be integral to determining the future course of any specific vehicular models.

=== Exterior design ===
The design team(s) responsible for the exterior of the vehicle develops the proportions, shape, and surface details of the vehicle. Exterior design is first done by a series of manual sketches and digital drawings. Progressively, more detailed drawings are executed and approved by appropriate layers of management, followed by digital rendering to images. Consumer feedback is generally sought at this point to help iteratively refine vehicle concepts according to the targeted market and will continue throughout the rest of the design refinement process. After more progressive refinement, industrial plasticine and or digital models are developed from and along with the drawings and images. The data from these models are then used to create quarter-scale and finally full-sized mock-ups of the final design. With three- and five-axis CNC milling machines, the clay model is first designed in a computer program and then "carved" using the machine and large amounts of clay. Even in times of photorealistic (three-dimensional) software and virtual models on power walls, the clay model is still the most important tool for a final evaluation of the exterior design of a vehicle and, therefore, is used throughout the industry.

=== Interior design ===
The designer responsible for the vehicles' interior develops the proportions, shape, placement, and surfaces for the instrument panel, seats, door trim panels, headliner, pillar trims, etc. Here the emphasis is on ergonomics and the comfort of the passengers. The procedure here is the same as with exterior design (sketch, digital model, and clay model).

=== Color and trim design ===
The color and trim (or color and materials) designer is responsible for the research, design, and development of all interior and exterior colors and materials used on a vehicle. These include paints, plastics, fabric designs, leather, grains, carpet, headliner, wood trim, and so on. Color, contrast, texture, and pattern must be carefully combined to give the vehicle a unique interior environment experience. Designers work closely with exterior and interior designers.

Designers draw inspiration from other design disciplines such as industrial design, fashion, home furnishing, architecture, and sometimes product design. Specific research is done into global trends to design for projects two to three model years in the future. Trend boards are created from this research to keep track of design influences as they relate to the automotive industry. The designer then uses this information to develop themes and concepts that are then further refined and tested on the vehicle models.

=== Graphic design ===
The design team also develops graphics for items, such as badges, decals, dials, switches, kick or tread strips, or liveries.

=== Computer-Aided Design and Class-A development ===
The sketches and rendering are transformed into 3D digital surface modeling and rendering for real-time evaluation with Math data in the initial stages. During the development process succeeding phases will require the 3D model fully developed to meet the aesthetic requirements of a designer as well as all engineering and manufacturing requirements. The fully developed CAS digital model will be re-developed for manufacturing meeting the Class-A surface standards that involve both technical as well as aesthetics. A Product Engineering team will further develop this data. These modelers usually have a background in industrial design or sometimes tooling engineering in the case of some Class-A modelers. Autodesk Alias and ICEM Surf are the two most widely used software tools for Class-A development. Uniform surface continuity is critical to ensure Class-A surface standards. The continuity of the areas is between the quality grades G0 through G3, with G3 guaranteeing the cleanest patch-to-patch transitions.

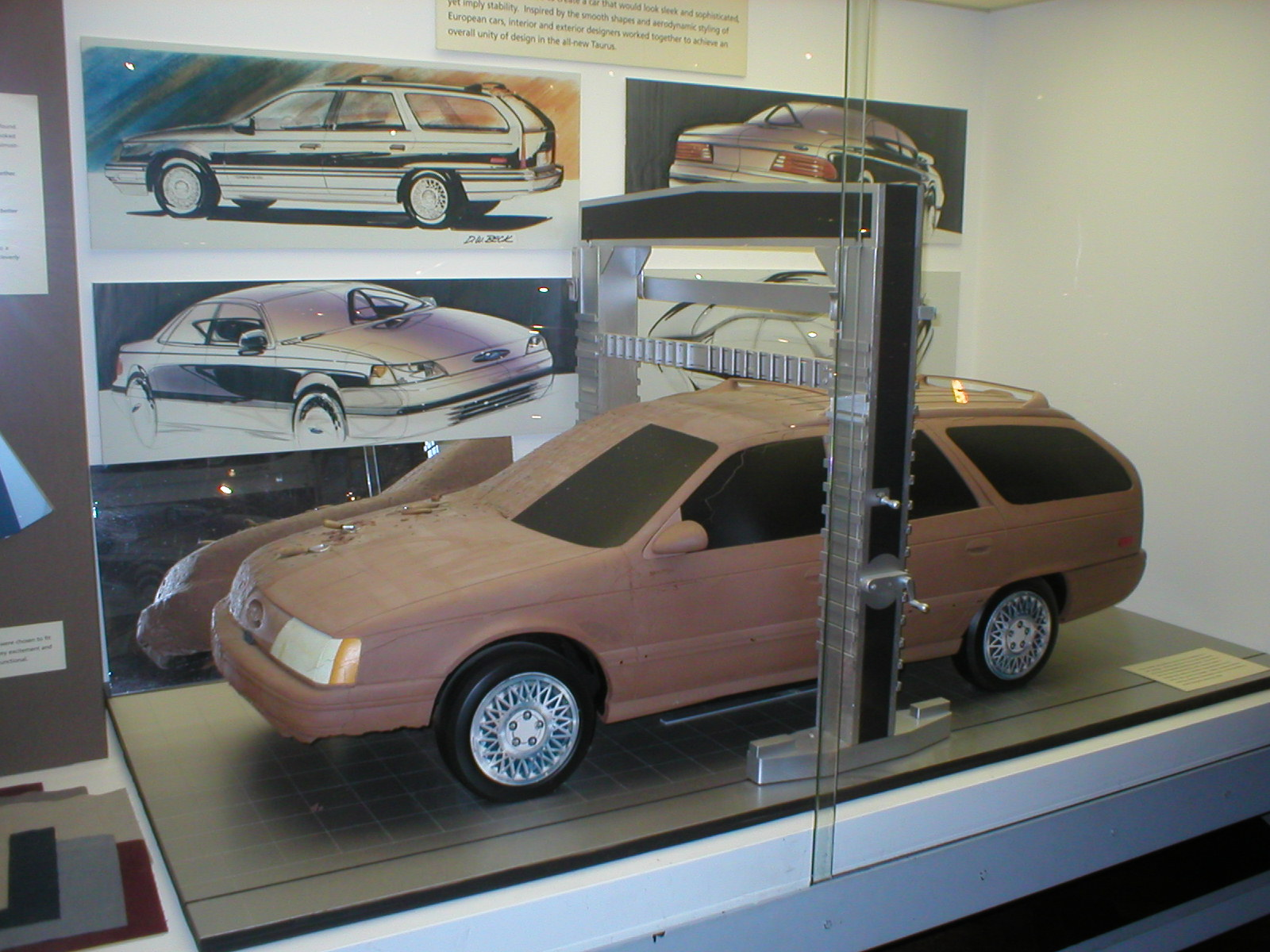
A 1986 Ford Taurus clay model on display in Ford Detroit Styling Studio

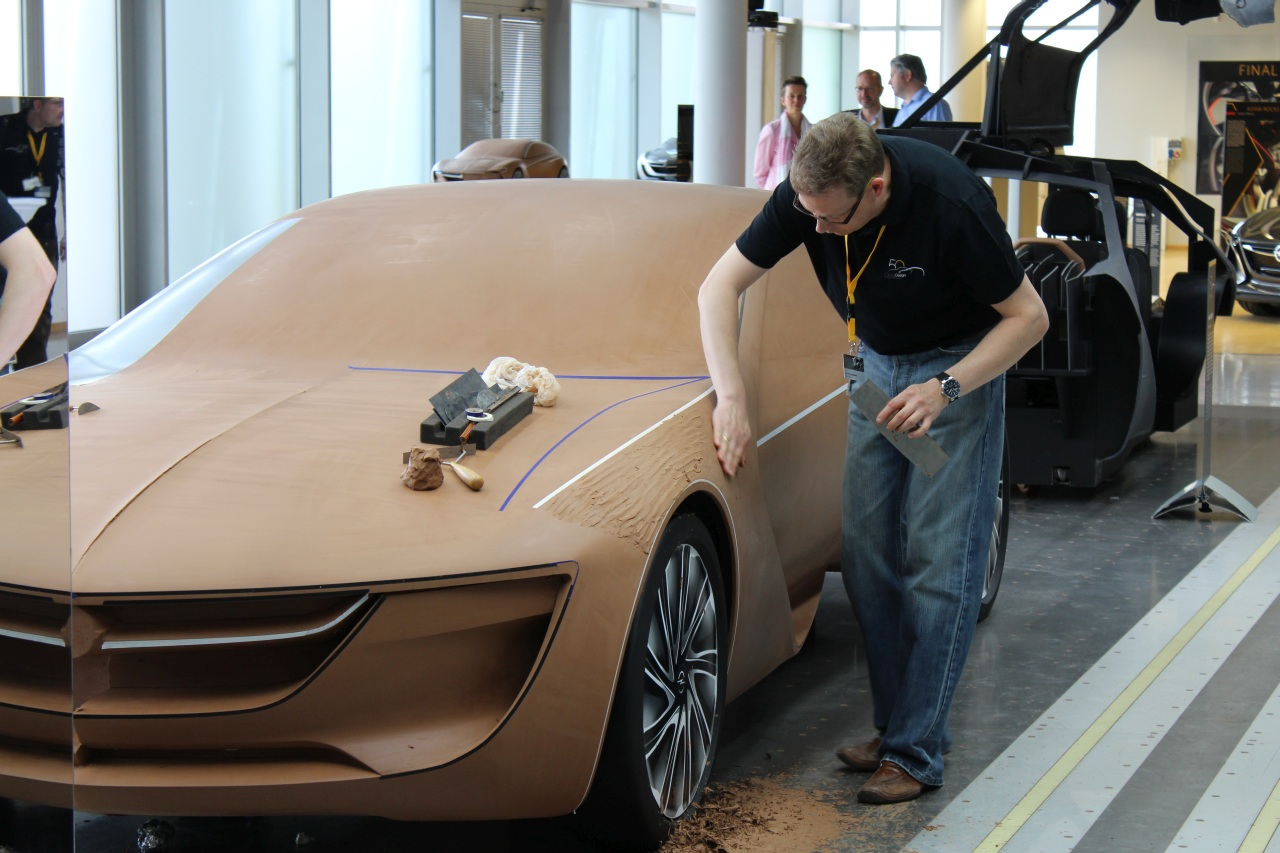
Opel Monza Concept in its early design stages

=== Design development cycle ===
Several manufacturers have slightly varied development cycles for designing an automobile, but in practice, these are the following:

- Design and consumer research
- Concept development sketching
- CAS (Computer Aided Styling)
- Clay modeling
- Interior buck model
- Vehicle ergonomics
- Class-A Surface Development
- Color and trim
- Vehicle graphics

The design process occurs concurrently with other product engineers who will be engineering the styling data for meeting performance, manufacturing, and safety regulations. From mid-phase, back-and-forth interactions between the designers and product engineers culminate into a finished product being manufacturing-ready.

Apart from this the engineering team parallelly works in the following areas. Product Engineering (Body In White Sheetmetal Design and Plastic engineering), NVH Development team, Prototype development, Powertrain engineering, Physical Vehicle validation, Tool and Die development, and Manufacturing process design.

=== Development team ===
The design team for a specific model consists of a chief designer and an exterior as well as an interior designer. In some cases, all three roles are done by one designer. Several junior designers are involved in the development process as well and make specific contributions all overseen by the chief designer. Apart from this, the color and trim designer works closely with other designers. The clay model team and digital model team work closely with the styling team all located within the studio. Apart from this, there would be studio heads, studio managers, and prototype engineers who would work across all teams in the studio. The total team size for developing a full car usually ranges from 25 to 40 members and the development time lasts for more than 24 months until signed-off for tooling and production. After that, a smaller team would be working until the vehicle launch.

== History ==
In the early days of the automobile, manufacturers prioritized function over form, focusing on building simple, reliable, and affordable vehicles. Some automakers began incorporating artists to combine styling with engineering. Visual appeal remained secondary to technical and safety advancements until the 1930s, an era that, despite its financial challenges, became a high point of creative coachbuilding. World War II halted the momentum, but it evolved when the industry restarted in the late 1940s, heavily influenced by the Jet Age.

Automobile design is an artistic form. However, the artwork and models created by designers are routinely destroyed so as not to be seen by competing automakers. Great car designers are visionary artists who can translate their ideas from sketches and models into tangible vehicles. Their work is a blend of artistry and engineering, shaped by collaborations with engineers who help bring their creative concepts to life. Some automobile forms have served to influence the success and careers of successive designers.

=== United States ===
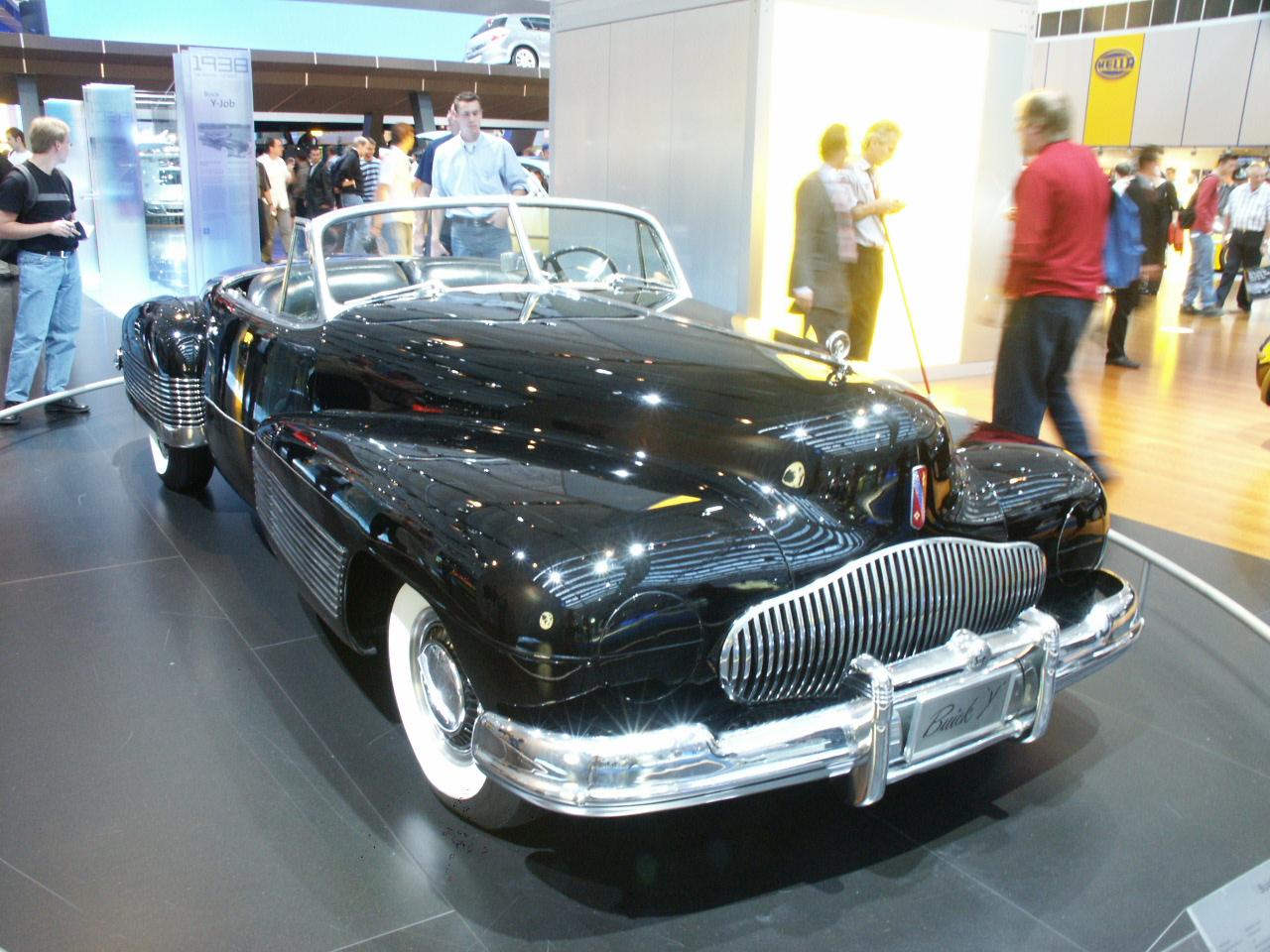
An early example of Harley Earl's work seen in the 1938 Buick Y-Job

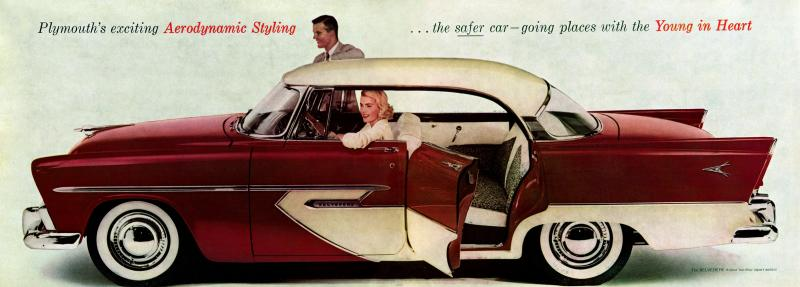
An early example of the Forward Look design, along with the tailfin by Virgil Exner on the 1956 Plymouth Fury

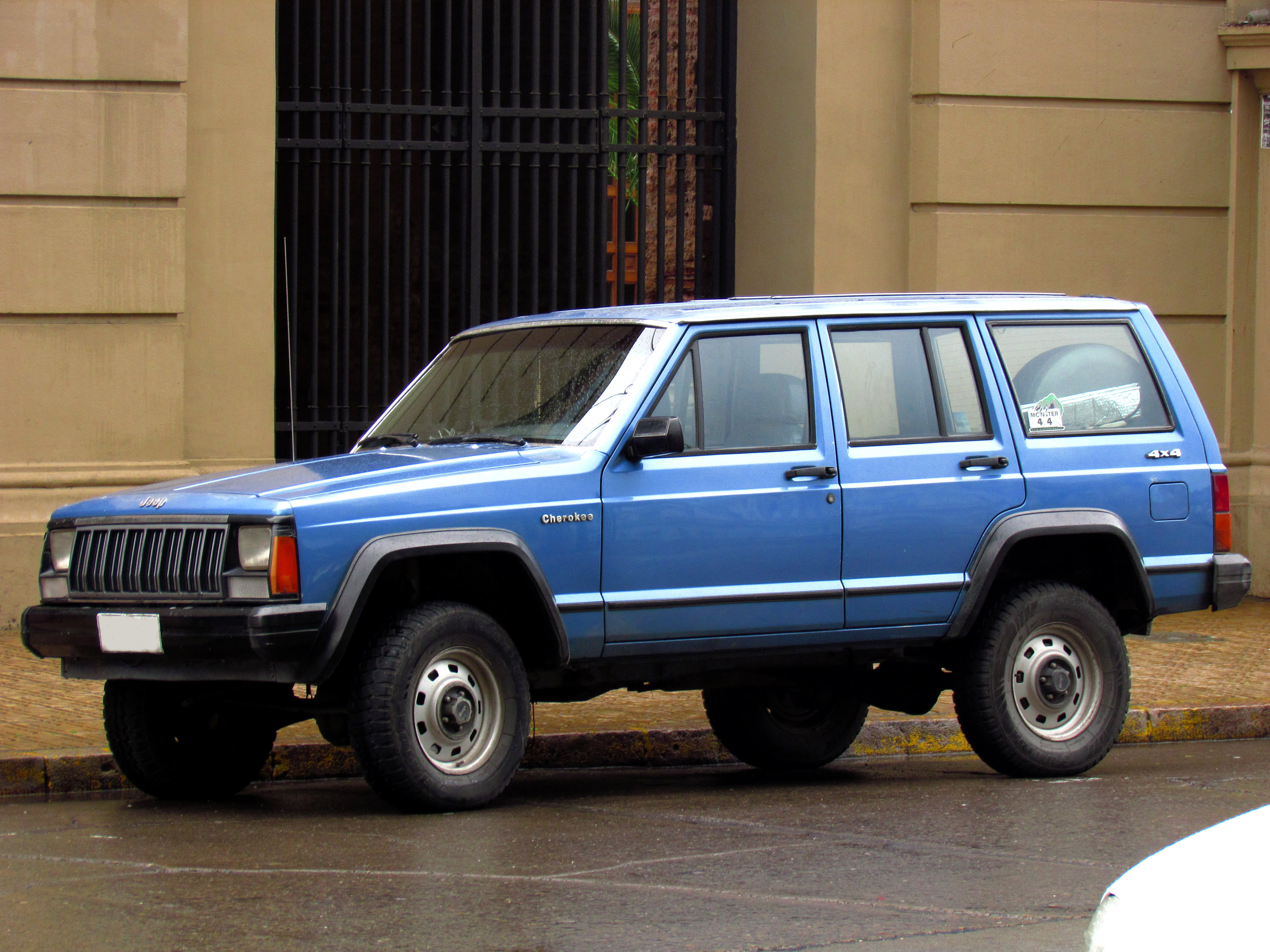
Jeep Cherokee (XJ), a design that other automakers later imitated

In the United States, automotive design reached a turning point in the 1920s when the American national automobile market began reaching saturation. To maintain unit sales, General Motors head Alfred P. Sloan Jr. suggested annual model-year design changes to convince car owners that they needed to buy a new replacement each year, an idea borrowed from the bicycle industry (though Sloan usually gets the credit or blame). Critics called his strategy planned obsolescence. Sloan preferred the term "dynamic obsolescence". This strategy had far-reaching effects on the auto business, the field of product design, and eventually the American economy.

The smaller automakers could not maintain the pace and expense of yearly re-styling. Henry Ford did not like the model-year change because he clung to an engineer's notions of simplicity, the economics of scale, and design integrity. GM surpassed Ford's sales in 1931 and became the dominant company in the industry thereafter. The frequent design changes also made it necessary to use a body-on-frame rather than the lighter but less adaptable monocoque design used by most European automakers.

In the 1930s, Chrysler's innovations with aerodynamics helped launch the Chrysler Airflow in 1934, which was revolutionary and radical compared to contemporary vehicles. However, inadequate consumer acceptance of the advanced appearance of the cars forced a re-design of succeeding models of the Airflow. This marketing experience made the entire industry take note of the high risks involved in incorporating major design advancements into their production cars.

A major influence on American auto styling and marketing was Harley Earl, who is credited with inventing the idea of a concept car, and who brought the tailfin and other aeronautical design references to auto design starting with the rear fenders of the 1948 Cadillac. Another notable designer was Chrysler group's designer Virgil Exner, who developed the Forward look design in the mid-1950s. Exner is also credited with using wind tunnel testing to justify incorporating tailfins, thus moving the company away from boxy-looking cars into more aerodynamic and futuristic designs that were influenced by rockets after WWII. Other influential automotive designers include Raymond Loewy, who was responsible for a number of Studebaker vehicles such as the Avanti, and Gordon Buehrig, who was responsible for the Auburn 851, as well as the Cord 810 and 812.

Starting in the 1960s, Dick Teague, who spent most of his career with American Motors Corporation (AMC), originated the concept of using interchangeable body panels so as to create a wide array of different vehicles using the same stampings, starting with the AMC Cavalier. Teague was responsible for automotive designs such as the two-seat AMC AMX muscle car, the subcompact Gremlin, the Pacer, and Matador coupe, as well as the original and market segment-creating, Jeep Cherokee.

Additionally during the 1960s, Ford's first-generation Ford Mustang and Thunderbird marked another era leading into new market segments from Detroit. The Ford Mustang achieved record sales in its first year of production and established the pony car segment.

Personal injury litigation has affected the design and appearance of the car in the 20th century.

=== Europe ===
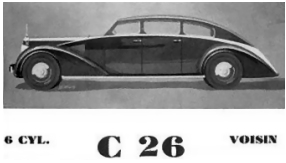
An early radical French Voisin C26

Until World War I, most automakers were concerned with mechanical reliability rather than the external appearance of their cars. Later, luxury and aesthetics became a demand, and also an effective marketing tool. Designs from each nation with their own strong cultural identity are reflected in their exterior and interior designs. World War II slowed the progress, but after the early 1950s, Italian designers set the trend and remained the driving force until the early part of the 1980s.

==== France ====
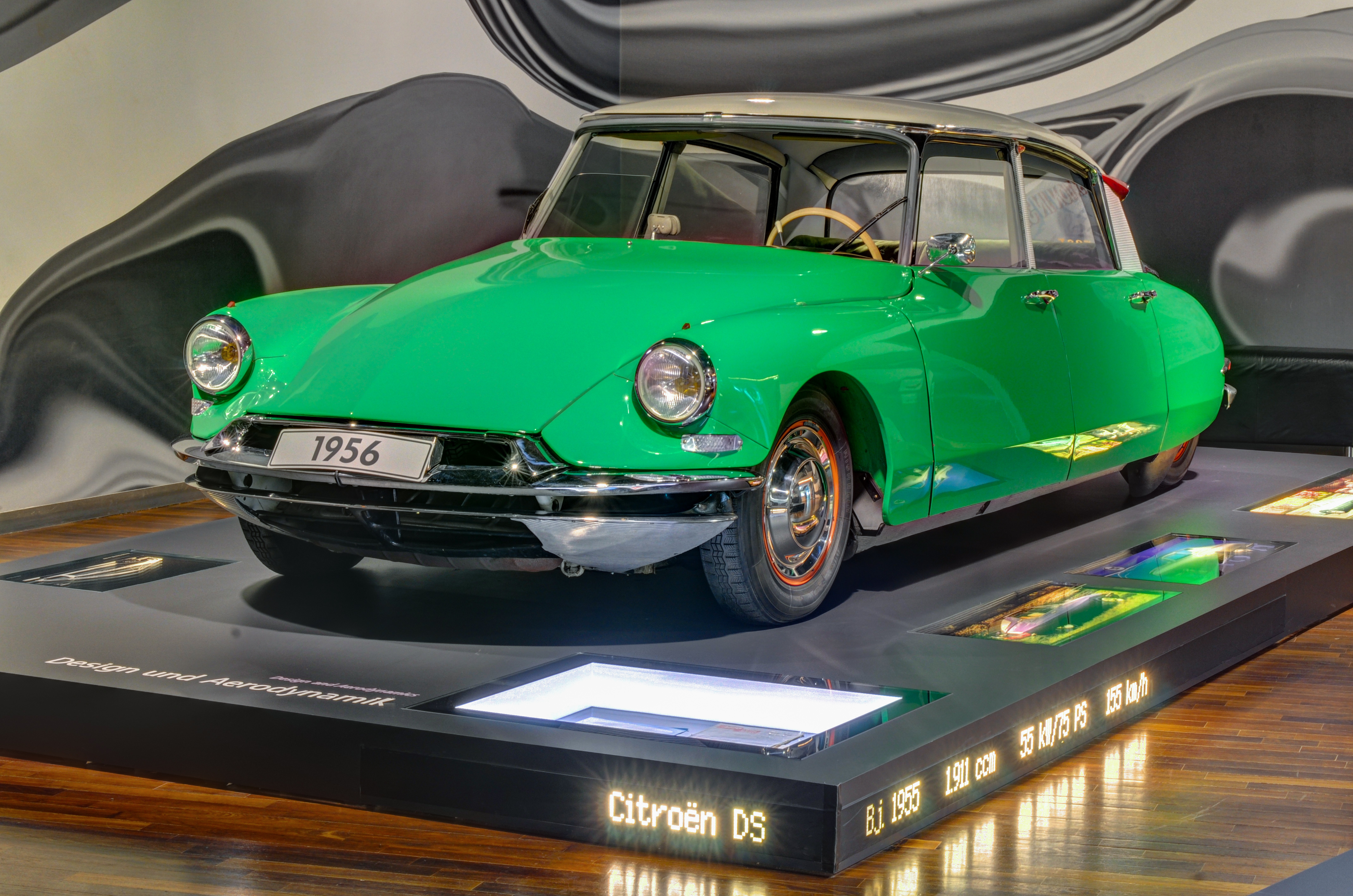
Citroën DS

In France notable designs came from Bugatti and Avions Voisin. Of the mass-selling cars, Citroën launched their vehicles with innovative designs and engineering, aided by the styling of Flaminio Bertoni as evident from the Citroën DS. After World War II, with the decline of the coachbuilding industry, French automakers (except Citroën) followed British and other popular trends until they gained financial stability. During the 1980s, manufacturers like Renault cultivated their own strong design identities with designers like Patrick Le Quément. Peugeot, which was dependent on Pininfarina since the early post-war period, later established its own brand identity from the 1980s onwards. Its other company, Citroën, still retains its distinctive French innovations for its designs.

==== Great Britain ====
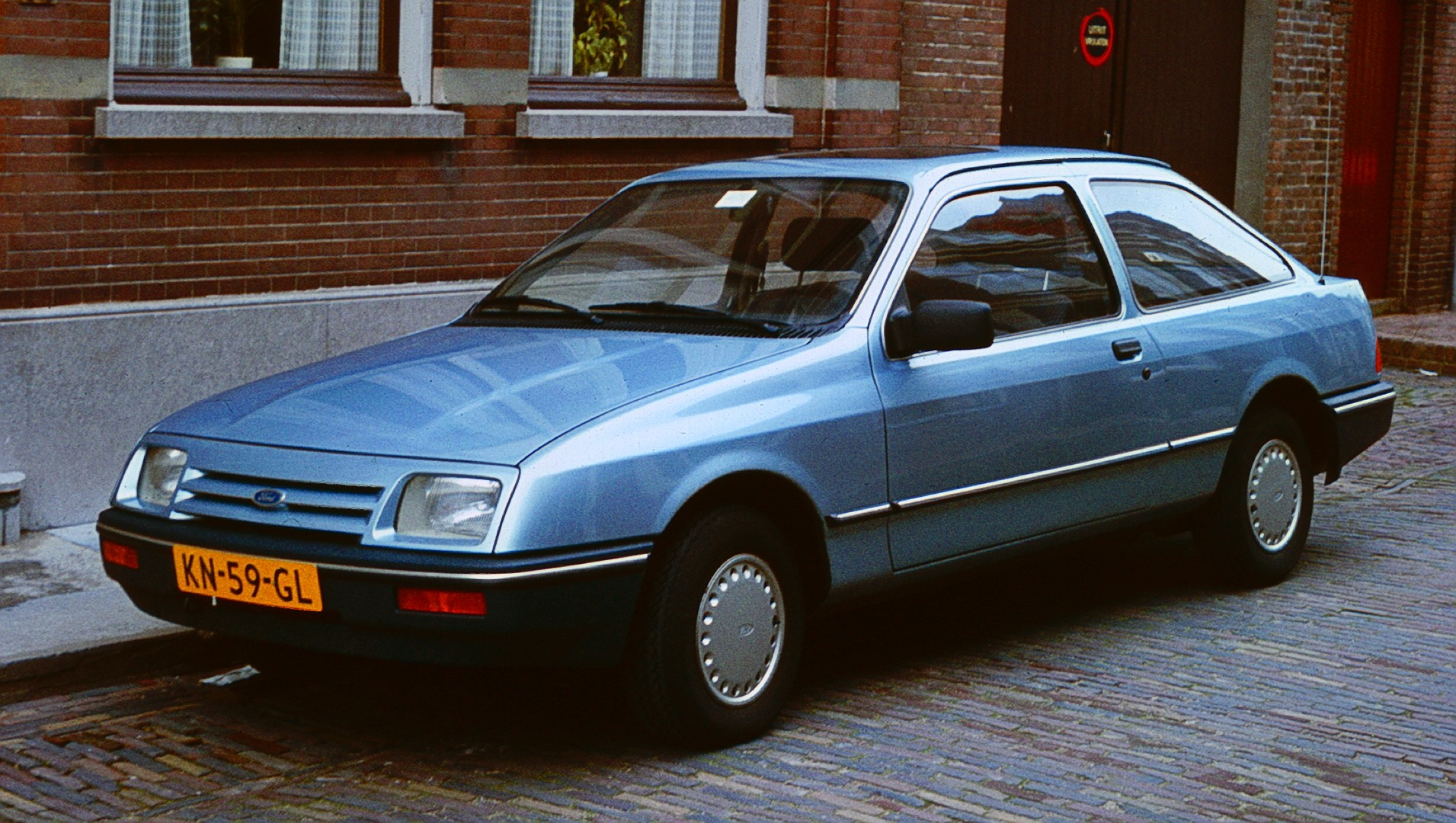
1981 Ford Sierra with "jelly-mold" or "aero look" (low CD) styling was advanced for its time.

Great Britain was Europe's leading manufacturer of automobiles until the late-1960s. During that era, there were more British-based automakers than in the rest of Europe combined. The British automobile industry catered to all segments ranging from compact, budget, sports, utility, and luxury-type cars. Car design in Britain was markedly different from other European designs largely because British designers were not influenced by other European art or design movements, as well as the British clay modelers, used a different sweep set.

British cars until World War II were sold in most of the British colonies. Innovations in vehicle packaging and chassis engineering combined with global familiarity with British designs meant vehicles were acceptable to public tastes at that time. British skilled resources such as panel beaters, die machinists, and clay modelers were also available partly due to their involvement with the motorsport industry.

Still, during the 1960s, British manufacturers sought professional help from Italian designers and studios such as Giovanni Michelotti, Ercole Spada, and Pininfarina. Notable British contributions to automobile designs were the Morris Mini by Alec Issigonis, several Jaguar Cars by Sir William Lyons and Malcolm Sayer, Aston Martin DB Series, and several cars from Triumph and MG. Ford Europe, based in Great Britain, is notable for the Ford Sierra line, a work of Uwe Bahnsen, Robert Lutz, and Patrick le Quément. Other notable British designers include William Towns for Aston Martin, and David Bache for Land Rover and Range Rover, and Ian Callum for Jaguar.

In the late 1980s, Royden Axe (previously Chrysler UK Design Director) and Gordon Sked along with Gerry McGovern produced most notably the MGF and Rover 800

During the complex changes in the British car industry in the 1990s and beyond, a mix of designers worked on all of the remaining mainstream brands under one design director and in one studio. The director most involved was Geoff Upex, with his team of Richard Woolley, Dave Saddington, George Thomson, Alan Mobberley, and Martin Peach (colour and trim). Together they created the Rover 75, 45, and 25 (previously 400 and 200) the L322 Range Rover, the T5 platform-based Discovery and Range Rover sport, the Freelander 2, and the Mini as requested by BMW before the company was sold

==== Germany ====
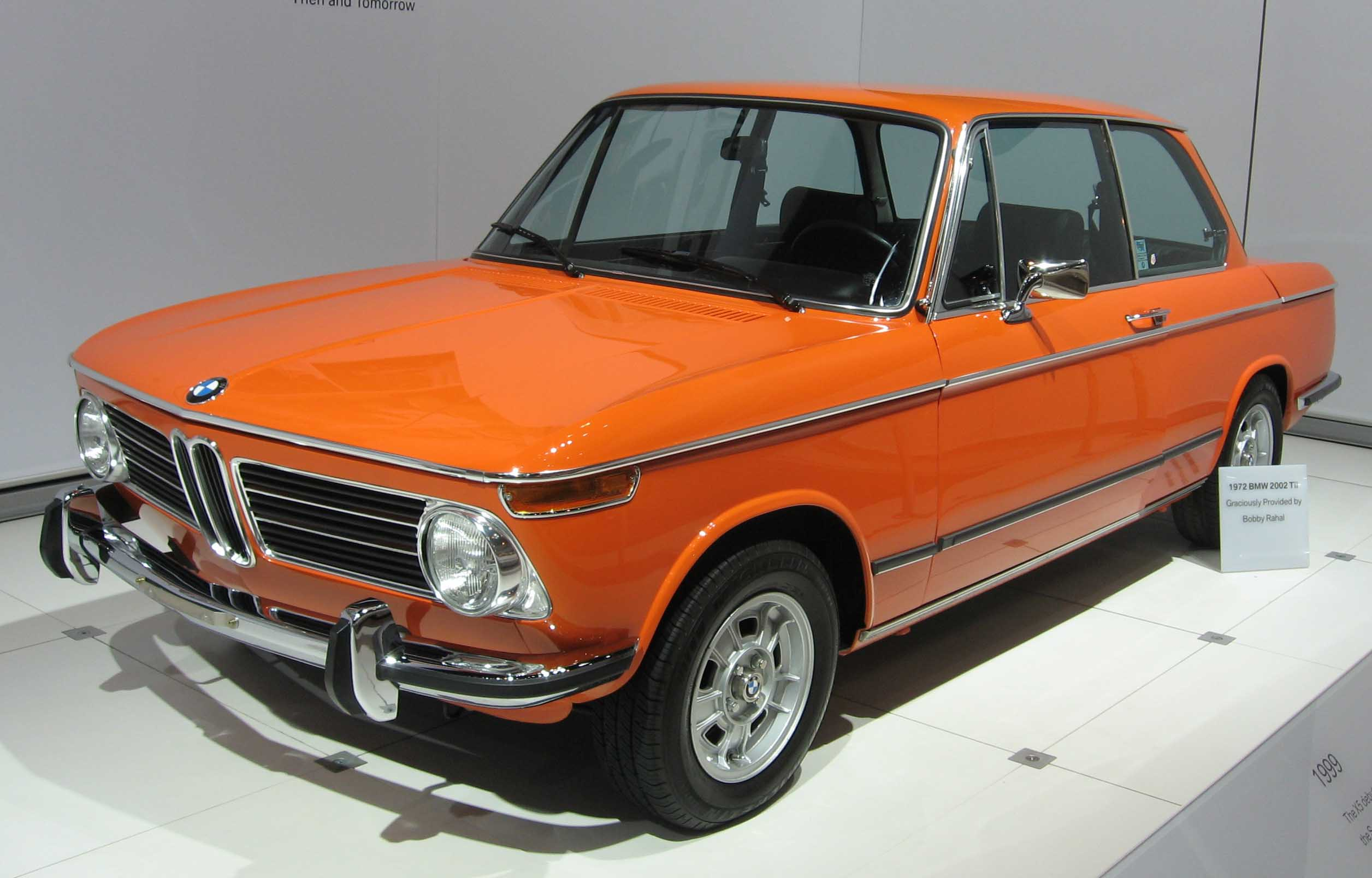
1972 BMW 2002, designed by Giovanni Michelotti

Germany is often considered the birthplace of industrial design with the Bauhaus School of Design, before it was closed down by the Nazi regime. Ferdinand Porsche and his family played a significant role in German design. Mercedes-Benz passenger cars were also in the luxury segment and played an important role in German car design. After the 1980s, German design evolved into a distinctive Teutonic style often to complement their highly engineered cars suited to Autobahns. The early German design clues of the present-day owe some part to Italian designers like Giovanni Michelotti, Ercole Spada, Bruno Sacco, and Giorgetto Giugiaro. During the mid- and late-20th century one of the most influential coach builders/designers in Germany was Karmann.

German designs started gaining popularity after the 1980s, notable after the formation of Audi. Volkswagen, which was dependent on Marcello Gandini, Giorgetto Giugiaro, and Karmann, later formed the contemporary design language along with Audi. BMW entered the automobile design with sporty-looking everyday sedans using Giovanni Michelotti. These models were later enhanced by Ercole Spada into the 1980s, and Klaus Luthe until the mid-1990s. The American-born designer Chris Bangle was hired by BMW in the late-1990s to redefine the brand. Bangle incorporated new single-press technology for compound curves to add controversial styling elements to his designs.

The Porsche family contribution was instrumental in the evolution of Porsche cars, while the Italian designer Bruno Sacco helped create various Mercedes Models from the 1960s to the 1990s.

==== Italy ====
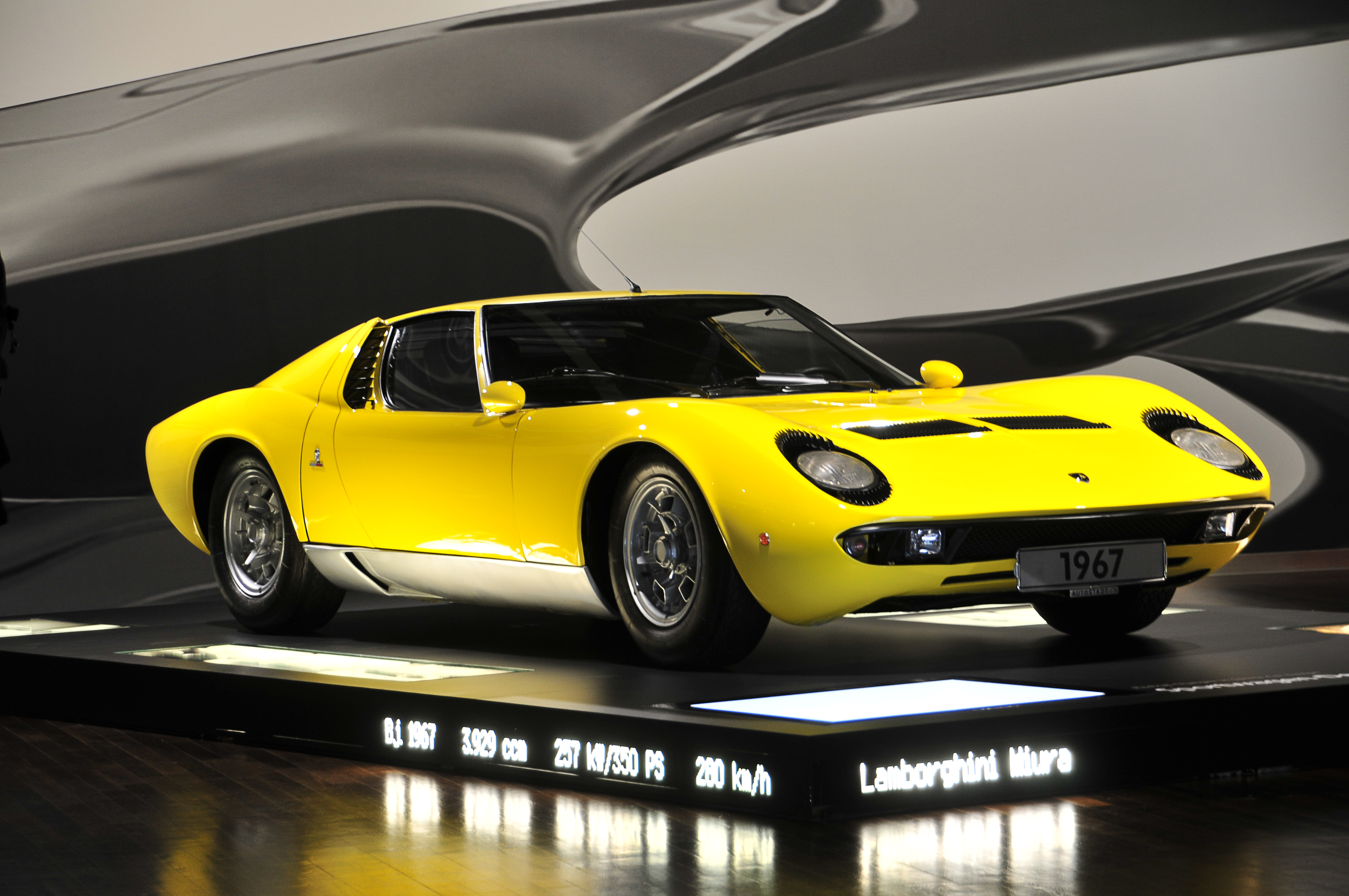
Lamborghini Miura from Bertone Studios, designed by Marcello Gandini

In Italy, Fiat and Alfa Romeo played a major role in car design. Many coachbuilders were dependent on these two major manufacturers. Italian manufacturers had a large presence in motorsports leading to several sport car manufacturers like Ferrari, Lancia, Lamborghini, Maserati, etc. During the late-1950s, Italian automobile designs gained global popularity coinciding with the modern fashion and architecture at that time around the world. Various design and technical schools in Turin turned out designers on a large scale. By the late-1960s, almost all Italian coachbuilders transformed into design studios catering to automakers around the world. The trend continued in the 1990s when the Japanese and Korean manufacturers sourced designs from these styling studios. One example is Pininfarina.

Some Italian designers whose design services were sought globally include Aldo Brovarone, Giovanni Michelotti, Ercole Spada, Bruno Sacco, Marcello Gandini, Giorgetto Giugiaro, and Walter de Silva.

==== Scandinavia ====
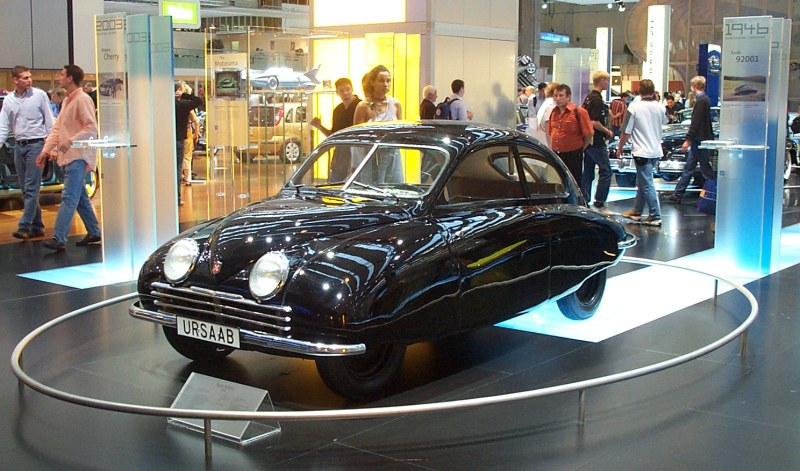
Ursaab, an early Saab concept illustrating an advanced headlamp treatment

Sweden had Volvo and Saab as domestic automakers, and the nation's northern location required that cars needed to withstand Nordic climate conditions. The Scandinavian design elements are known for their minimalism and simplicity. One of the early original Scandinavian designs was the Saab 92001 by Sixten Sason and Gunnar Ljungström. Koenigsegg, founded in the 1990s, became Sweden's first domestic producer of high end sports cars, with many of their models featuring in house designs by Swedish designers.

==== Czechoslovakia ====
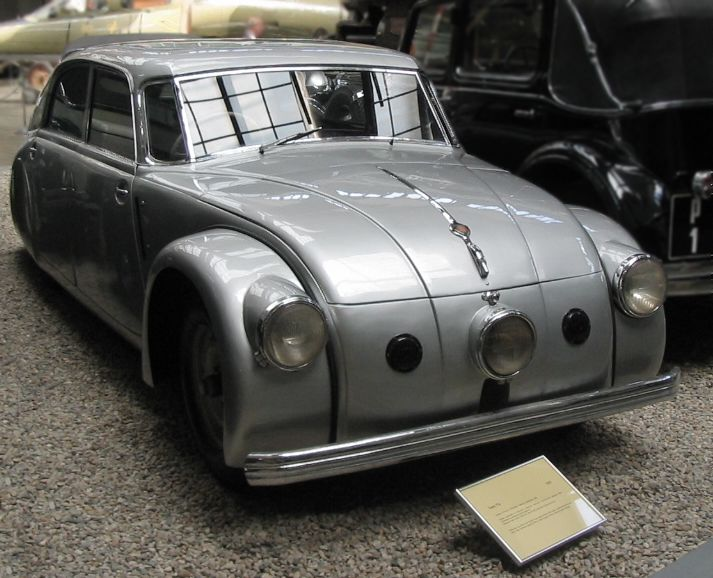
1934 Czechoslovak Tatra 77, the first serial-produced aerodynamically designed automobile, designed by Hans Ledwinka and Paul Jaray

Before World War II and until the early-1990s, Czechoslovakia had a strong presence in the automotive industry with manufacturers like Škoda, Jawa, Tatra, CZ, Praga, and Zetor. Czech automobiles were generally known for their originality in mechanical simplicity and designs were remarkably Bohemian as evident from Tatra cars and Jawa motorcycles. During the Communist regime, the design started falling back and ultimately the domestic automakers ended up as subsidiaries of EU-based companies.

== See also ==
- Alternative propulsion
- Automobile layout
- Automotive Engineering
- Automotive aerodynamics
- Automotive design terminology
- Cab forward
- Car body style
- Car classification
- Car model
- Car safety
- Coachbuilder
- Computer-aided industrial design
- Concept vehicle
- Ecodesign
- Facelift (automobile)
- H-point
- Industrial Design
- List of auto parts
- List of automotive designers
- Mass production
- Platform
- Ponton styling
- Pre-production car
- Prototype
- Solid freeform fabrication
- Three-box design
- Virtual tuning
- Wind tunnel
