= Project portfolio management =

Centralized management of project management processes

Project portfolio management (PPM) is the centralized management of the processes, methods, and technologies used by project managers and project management offices (PMOs) to analyze and collectively manage current or proposed projects based on numerous key characteristics. The objectives of PPM are to determine the optimal resource mix for delivery and to schedule activities to best achieve an organization's operational and financial goals, while honouring constraints imposed by customers, strategic objectives, or external real-world factors. Standards for Portfolio Management include Project Management Institute's framework for project portfolio management, Management of Portfolios by Office of Government Commerce and the PfM² Portfolio Management Methodology by the PM² Foundation.

== Key capabilities ==
PPM provides program and project managers in large, program/project-driven organizations with the capabilities needed to manage the time, resources, skills, and budgets necessary to accomplish all interrelated tasks. It provides a framework for issue resolution and risk mitigation, as well as the centralized visibility to help planning and scheduling teams to identify the fastest, cheapest, or most suitable approach to deliver projects and programs.

=== Pipeline management ===
Pipeline management involves steps to ensure that an adequate number of project proposals are generated and evaluated to determine whether (and how) a set of projects in the portfolio can be executed with finite development resources in a specified time. There are three major sub-components to pipeline management: ideation, work intake processes, and Phase-Gate reviews. Fundamental to pipeline management is the ability to align the decision-making process for estimating and selecting new capital investment projects with the strategic plan.

=== Resource manager ===
The focus on the efficient and effective deployment of an organization's resources where and when they are needed. These can include financial resources, inventory, human resources, technical skills, production, and design. In addition to project-level resource allocation, users can also model 'what-if' resource scenarios, and extend this view across the portfolio.

=== Change control ===
The capture and prioritization of change requests that can include new requirements, features, functions, operational constraints, regulatory demands, and technical enhancements. PPM provides a central repository for these change requests and the ability to match available resources to evolving demand within the financial and operational constraints of individual projects.

=== Financial management ===
With PPM, the Office of Finance can improve their accuracy for estimating and managing the financial resources of a project or group of projects. In addition, the value of projects can be demonstrated in relation to the strategic objectives and priorities of the organization through financial controls and to assess progress through earned value and other project financial techniques. It is an important part.

=== Risk management ===
An analysis of the risk sensitivities residing within each project, as the basis for determining confidence levels across the portfolio. The integration of cost and schedule risk management with techniques for determining contingency and risk response plans, enable organizations to gain an objective view of project uncertainties. At the portfolio level, risk management enables organizations to protect portfolio investments and balance the level of risk in the portfolio.

== The history of project portfolio management ==
The roots of project portfolio management can be traced back to financial theories that emerged in the 1950s, often linked with the pioneering work of Harry Markowitz, which was later recognized with a Nobel Prize. In essence, portfolio theories underline the importance of coordinating diverse elements to mitigate collective investment risks. These theories enable the optimization of portfolio benefits, the effective utilization and cultivation of limited resources, and the proper consideration of portfolio stakeholders.

== Enterprise project portfolio management ==
Enterprise project portfolio management (EPPM) is a top-down approach to managing all project-intensive work and resources across the enterprise. This contrasts with the traditional approach of combining manual processes, desktop project tools, and PPM applications for each project portfolio environment.

=== Business drivers for EPPM ===
The PPM landscape is evolving rapidly as a result of the growing preference for managing multiple capital investment initiatives from a single, enterprise-wide system. This more centralized approach, and resulting 'single version of the truth' for project and project portfolio information, provides the transparency of performance needed by management to monitor progress versus the strategic plan.

The key aims of EPPM can be summarized as follows:

- Prioritize the right projects and programs: EPPM can guide decision-makers to strategically prioritize, plan, and control enterprise portfolios. It also ensures the organization continues to increase productivity and on-time delivery - adding value, strengthening performance, and improving results.
- Eliminate surprises: formal portfolio project oversight provides managers and executives with a process to identify potential problems earlier in the project lifecycle, and the visibility to take corrective action before they impact financial results.
- Build contingencies into the overall portfolio: flexibility often exists within individual projects but, by integrating contingency planning across the entire portfolio of investments, organizations can have greater flexibility around how, where, and when they need to allocate resources, alongside the flexibility to adjust those resources in response to a crisis.
- Maintain response flexibility: with in-depth visibility into resource allocation, organizations can quickly respond to escalating emergencies by maneuvering resources from other activities, while calculating the impact this will have on the wider business.
- Do more with less: For organizations to systematically review project management processes while cutting out inefficiencies and automating those workflows and to ensure a consistent approach to all projects, programs, and portfolios while reducing costs.
- Ensure informed decisions and governance: by bringing together all project collaborators, data points, and processes in a single, integrated solution, a unified view of project, program, and portfolio status can be achieved within a framework of rigorous control and governance to ensure all projects consistently adhere to business objectives.
- Extend best practice enterprise-wide: organizations can continuously vet project management processes and capture best practices, providing efficiency as a result.
- Understand future resource needs: by aligning the right resources to the right projects at the right time, organizations can ensure individual resources are fully leveraged and requirements are clearly understood. EPPM software also allows an organization to establish complete project capacity.

== Project portfolio optimization ==
A key result of PPM is to decide which projects to fund in an optimal manner. Project Portfolio Optimization (PPO) is the effort to make the best decisions possible under these conditions.

== See also ==
- Aggregate project plan
- Comparison of project-management software
- Project management
- Project management software
- Project management simulation
