= Chief product officer =

Corporate title

A Chief Product Officer (CPO), sometimes known as Head of Product, is a corporate title referring to an executive responsible for various product-related activities in an organization. They focus on bringing the product strategy to align with the business strategy and to deploy that throughout the organization. They are most common in technology companies, or organizations where technology is now a large part of the way they serve customers (such as streaming platforms, social media platforms like Facebook, etc).

== Role ==
A CPO is responsible for all product-related matters. This usually includes product strategy, product vision, product innovation, product design, product development, project management and product marketing. In many technology companies, this position includes distribution, manufacturing, and procurement.

== See also ==
- Product Manager
- Product Management
- Chief Executive Officer
- Chief Technology Officer
