= Curt Kolcun =

Curt Kolcun (born June 26, 1961) was the Microsoft vice president for U.S. Public Sector since July 2008 until September 2017. He was responsible for all of Microsoft's business in federal government, state and local government, and education markets, including students, K-12 and higher education.

== Career ==
A veteran of Microsoft since 1989, Kolcun has been the Vice President Microsoft's Federal government business since 2003, and has been responsible for sales, contracting, pre-sales technical support, consulting services and product marketing.

Under his leadership, the federal team has grown its business 49 percent since 2003. The team has also implemented key initiatives such as the Federal Desktop Core Configuration (FDCC), a U.S. Government mandate designed to provide a single, standard, enterprise-wide, managed environment for desktops and laptops running Microsoft Windows XP or Windows Vista.
