= Double Diamond (design process model) =

Process for problem solving

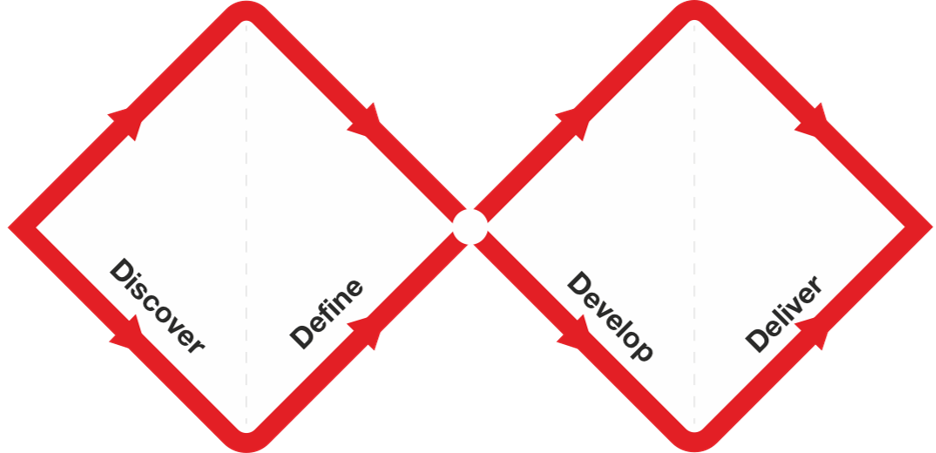
The Design Council's visual representation of their Double Diamond design and innovation process

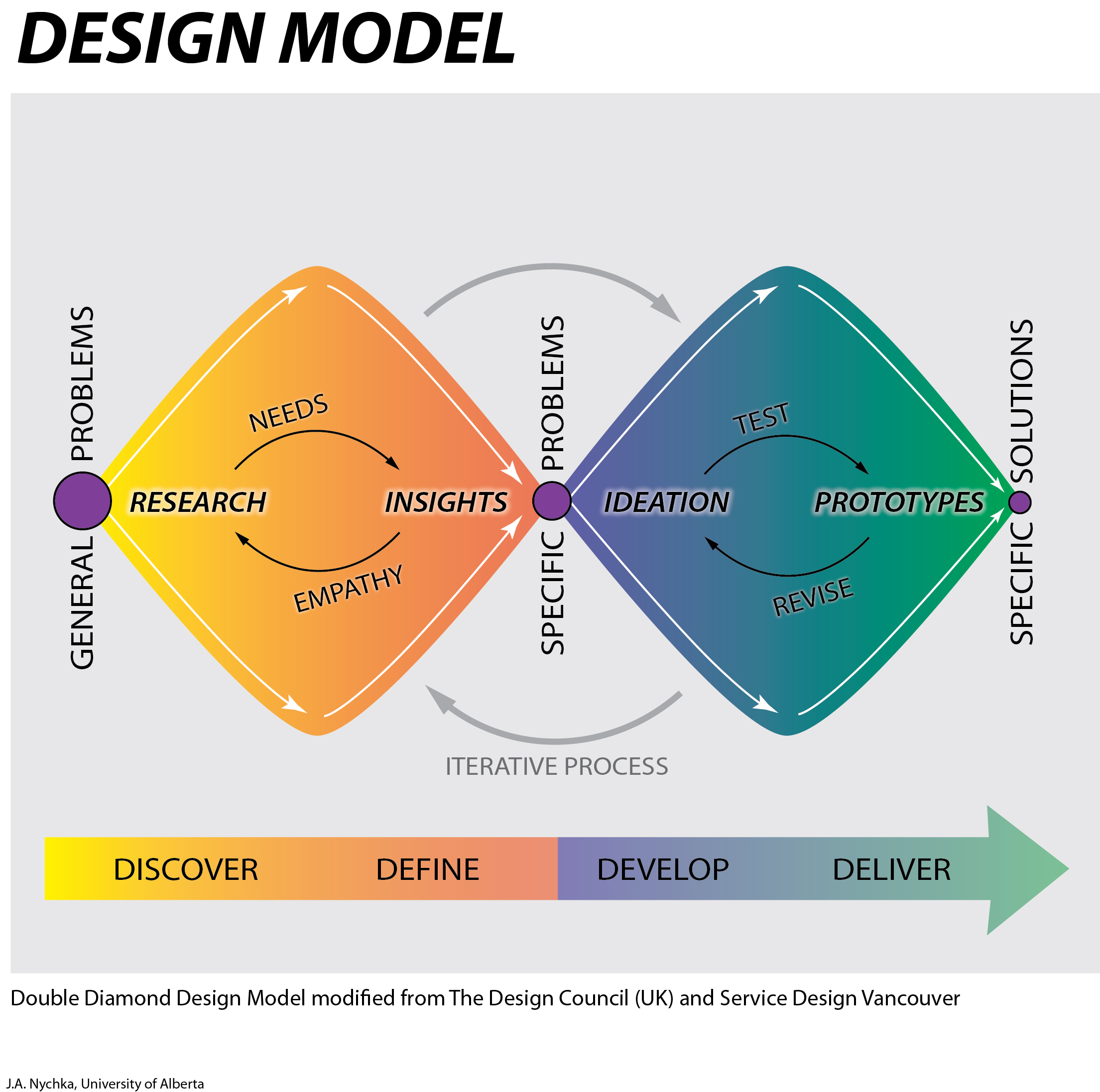
An adaptation of the Double Diamond Design Model to highlight the iterative nature of the design process

Double Diamond is a design process model popularized by the British Design Council in 2005. The process was adapted from the divergence-convergence model proposed in 1996 by Hungarian-American linguist Béla H. Bánáthy. The two diamonds represent a process of exploring an issue more widely or deeply (divergent thinking) and then taking focused action (convergent thinking). It suggests that, as a design method, the design process should have four phases:

- Discover: Understand the issue, rather than assuming its nature: speak to and spend time with people who are affected by the issue, to find out which problems are common among users. It is critical to start from the issue you aim to address, and not from the solution you wish to use.
- Define: With insight gathered from the discovery phase, distill the information, identify chains of cause-and-effect, and define the problem. This requires both differentiating and synthesizing the challenges faced by many users, to outline the problem space and appreciate its complexity.
- Develop: Come up with different solutions to the clearly defined problem, seeking inspiration from elsewhere and co-designing with a range of different people and specialties. Approaching a problem with a variety of strategies accesses creative solutions which may not be apparent to those experienced in one particular field.
- Deliver: Test different solutions at a small scale, and iterate and improve the solutions which address users' needs. Reject solutions that do not work, or cannot scale up to practical application.

To celebrate 20 years of the Double Diamond in 2023, the Design Council released a visual representation under an open license and created a Mural template.

The Double Diamond model is used in design education, and has been adapted to provide additional details for following the model, along with suggesting the iterative nature to design between each diamond.

== See also ==
- Product planning
- Product design
