= ICEM Surf =

Computer-aided industrial design software

- Developer: Dassault Systèmes
- Stable release: ICEM Surf 2022 / 2022-11-10
- Operating system: Windows
- Type: CAID software
- License: Proprietary software
- Website: Official website

ICEM Surf is a computer-aided industrial design (a.k.a. CAID) software used for creating 3D digital surfaces for automotive design and industrial design. This software is used to create class A surfaces using the Bézier surface modeling method. ICEMSurf was later purchased by Dassault Systèmes. Its similar rival is Autodesk Alias.

== History ==
ICEM Surf, originally known as VW Surf, was developed by Volkswagen in the 1980s for advanced 3D surface modelling class A surfaces, visualization and analysis for use in the vehicle body development process.

Later, VW Surf was made commercially available to other automotive companies and was renamed as ICEM Surf and a joint venture company ICEM Technologies was floated to market and support the software. Later in the mid 1990s post Europe success, the division was spun off and became part of Control Data Systems, Inc. whose first CAD/CAM product was released way back in 1978. For a brief period, ICEM Technologies was part of PTC and again was a standalone company. Since 2007 ICEM Surf is part of Dassault Systèmes .

== Products ==
- ICEM Surf Professional – The premier module for developing class A surfaces using free form methods
- ICEM Surf Master
- ICEM Surf Magic
- ICEM Surf Realtime – Offers rendering tools for designer to generate a photo-realistic representation of the CAD model.
- ICEM Surf Scan Modelling – Extra tools to generate model from point clouds or facet data.
- ICEM Surf Advanced Tools – more advanced industry specific tools to create accelerated Surfaces, Advanced filleting, Gaps, and advanced analysis tools.
- ICEM Surf Safety Analysis – Developed for safety and legislation studies during design to detect edges and corners on a 3D model that may cause injuries.
