= Product planning =

Product planning (or product discovery) is the ongoing process of identifying and articulating market requirements that define a product's feature set. It serves as the basis for decision-making about price, distribution and promotion. Product planning is also the means by which companies and businesses can respond to long-term challenges within the business environment, often achieved by managing the product throughout its life cycle using various marketing strategies, including product extensions or improvements, increased distribution, price changes and promotions. It involves understanding the needs and wants of core customer groups so products can target key customer desires and allows a firm to predict how a product will be received within a market upon launch.

== The product planning process ==
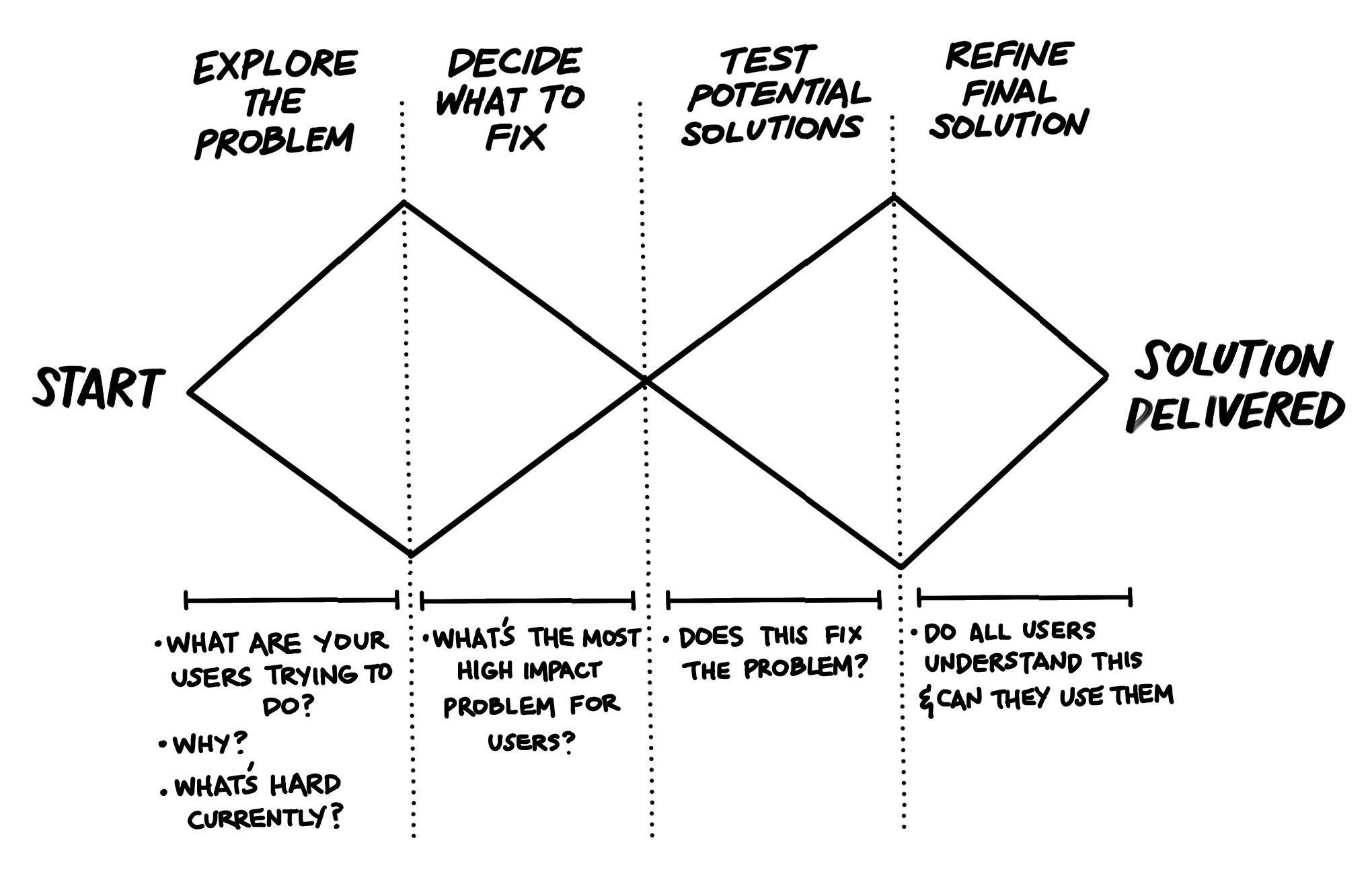
Double diamond product discovery process

=== Developing the product concept ===
In the product concept phase, managers generate ideas for new product development by identifying certain problems that consumers face or various customer needs. For example, a small computer retailer may see the need to create a computer repair division for the products it sells. After idea conception, managers may plan the dimensions and features of the product and develop a trial product.

=== Studying the market ===
The next step is engaging in a competitor analysis. Secondary research usually provides details on key competitors and their market share, which is the percent of total sales that they hold in the marketplace. The business can then determine places in which it has an advantage over the competition to identify areas of opportunity.

=== Market research ===
Market research is one stage of product planning and is regarded as the way to accomplish the activity through designing questions, preparing the samples, collecting data and analysing them. It provides significant insight into customers' wants, needs, buying habits and behaviours, and is a key tool used in the product planning process. For example, customer satisfaction information can be obtained through surveys and market research. The process consists of 4 components: definition, collection, analysis and interpretation.

==== Qualitative and Quantitative Research ====
Both qualitative marketing research and quantitative marketing research techniques can be used within marketing research. The aim of qualitative research is to gather an in-depth understanding of human behavior and the reasons that govern such behaviour. The qualitative method investigates the why and how of decision making, not just what, where, when. Hence, smaller but focused samples are more often used than large samples. Quantitative research refers to the systematic empirical investigation of social phenomena via statistical, mathematical or numerical data or computational techniques. The objective of quantitative research is to develop and employ mathematical models, theories and/or hypotheses pertaining to phenomena.

Market researchers use quantitative and qualitative research to gain better and more complete perspectives about a market segment or hypothesis. Qualitative research involves consideration and analysis that are non-numerical in nature, which includes questions of "how" and "what". Qualitative research is suited to solve the problem areas of basic market exploratory studies, product development and diagnostic studies. In market exploratory studies, the research findings can be used to define consumer segmentations in relation to a product brand or understand the dimensions which differentiate between brands. In new product development, product, packaging, positioning and advertising information can be collected through researching to confirm a new product proposition. In diagnostic studies, qualitative research is used to determine how the brand image has changed since the start of an advertising campaign.

==== Research methods ====
The methods of qualitative research can be departed into observation and focus groups. Observation is used in observation-based research, in which people may not articulate correctly and clearly of their thoughts. A particular example is the application in in-store shopping surveys, which regularly allow customers to try the products and gather feedback. Focus group is a tool on the basis of psychotherapy where it has found that if people are divided into small groups and asked to share their opinions suggestions, and open up. Because there will generate a brainstorming effect in the groups so that a comment from one person can stimulate another one's ideas. In general, there are always need four groups to cover a single respondent type. The outcomes of group discussions rely on the group leaders’ abilities of structuring the discussion, conducting the meeting and analysing and understanding the results.

Quantitative research is about understanding aspects of a market or what kinds of customers make up the market. It can be split into soft and hard parts. Soft parts refer to phenomena like customer attitudes and hard part is market size, brand shares and so on. Quantitative researchers are different from qualitative researchers, they pay more attention to asking 'What' questions. Quantitative research often provides three aims: description, forecasting and decision-making. Quantitative market research means getting relevant information or measures from each single customer or shopper who are carrying out a census in the market. It is based on the strict sampling methods so that its data or results have levels of accuracy and can be taken to represent and stand for the population or to projecting.

If the survey results prove favorable, the company may decide to sell the new product on a small scale or regional basis. During this time, the company will distribute the products in one or more cities. The company will run advertisements and sales promotions for the product, tracking sales results to determine the products potential success.

== Product lifecycle ==
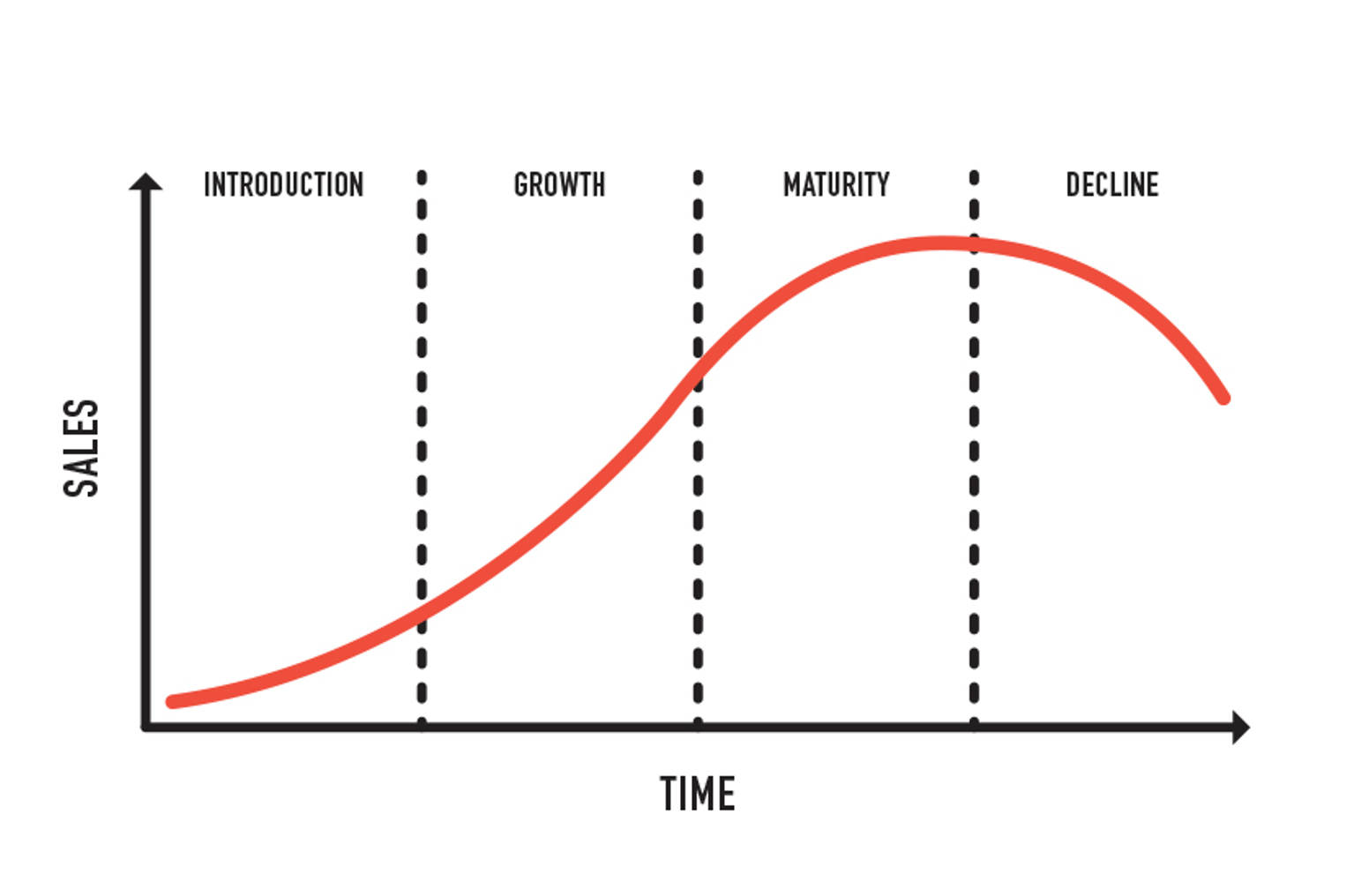
Four stages of the product lifecycle

Product planning must also include managing the product through various stages of its product lifecycle. These stages include the introduction, growth, maturity and decline stages. Sales are usually strong during the growth phase, while competition is low. However, continued success of the product will pique the interest of competitors, which will develop products of their own. The introduction of these competitive products may force a small company to lower its price. This low pricing strategy may help prevent the small company from losing market share. The company may also decide to better differentiate its product to keep its prices steady. For example, a small cell phone company may develop new, useful features on its cell phones that competitors do not have. Product lifecycle can be viewed as an important source of investment decision for the company.

If a company or brand wants to make sure that its products are successful, it needs to study the product lifecycle to analyze market attractiveness and supplement the conclusion before it launches a new product or enters a new market. Product lifecycle plays an important role in marketing. The first reason is that the managers will follow the four stages to make product plans for pushing out new products. Secondly, the level and growth of sales will change a lot during the four stages so the managers need to adjust the product plan appropriately and timely. The last one is that the prices and costs will decrease markedly in the early stages of the product lifecycle.

=== Introduction ===
The first stage is the introduction (or market development), when a product is first brought to market. The goal in this stage is to attract customer attention as much as possible and confirm the product's initial distribution. In this stage will be the first communication between marketers and customers relating to this product and will be the first time the consumer is aware of the product. In addition, the cost of the things will be high like research, testing and development and the sales are low as the customer base is small.

=== Growth ===
The second stage is growth. In this stage, the new products have been accepted in the market and their sales and profits has begun to increase, the competition has happened so that the company will promote their quality to stay competitive. The products also have basic consumers’ attention and can develop their loyal customers. There will have second communication as marketers can start to receive customers’ feedback and then make improvements.

=== Maturity ===
The third stage is maturity, where the sales and profit have grown slowly and will reach their peak. The firm typically faces fierce competition at this stage.

=== Decline ===
The last stage is decline which means the product is going to end and be discontinued. The sales of product will decrease until it is no longer in demand as it has become saturated, all the customers who want to buy this product has already got that. Then the company or brand will cut down the old products and pays attention to designing and developing the new products to gain back the customer base, stay in the markets and make profits.

== See also ==
- Product management
- Project planning
