= Service product management =

Service Product Management deals with managing a service product across its complete life cycle. This organizational function is equally common between Business-to-business as well as Business-to-consumer businesses. A service product, unlike a hardware or software product, is intangible and manifests itself as pure professional services or as a combination of services with necessary software and/or hardware. The service product management practice ensures management of a profitable service in the marketplace. Service Product manager identifies profitable service space, packages services in a productized form and delivers the same to the market. The function is a core service business management function and is a mix of sales and marketing functions. The function interfaces with various organizational groups like Strategy, Planning, Financial Controls /Management Accounting, Sales, Marketing Communications etc.

== Functions of a Service Product Manager ==
According to author Linda Gorchels, the functions of a service product manager are:

- Service Idea Generation/Management - The function deals with capturing market's unmet and/or under-served needs, filtering the ideas based on business viability, business feasibility and potential, scale-ability, company strategy, and capital rate of return considerations. The end result is a potential set of market feasibility and market features captured in a marketing requirement document.
- Service Product Creation - Potentially saleable service features are captured and productized. That means creation of necessary product documentation like executive materials, service product document, technical services document, service scope etc.
- Service Sales Support - Service product management supports service sales by providing accurate resource estimate and in the right mix to provide an efficient product cost base on which to baseline the customer pricing.
- Demand Supply Planning - Services profitability management by supporting balance between service demand and supply of necessary service resources.
- Business Management System Support - Efficient management of service product cost and revenues according to service contract and incurred costs. The same is generally needs a service product manager to provide product data management for Enterprise resource planning systems.
- Marketing and Market Communications - Industry event participation, press release, consensus building, delivering service messaging through various available marketing channels.
- Knowledge Management - Manage the knowledge management process and best practices for the service.
- Service Ramp Down - Manage the decision process of ramping down service product, and executing the service ramp down thus ending the service product management process.
