= Product requirements document =

Outline of intended product functions

A product requirements document (PRD) is a document containing all the requirements for a certain product. It is written to allow people to understand what a product should do. A PRD should, however, generally avoid anticipating or defining how the product will do it in order to later allow interface designers and engineers to use their expertise to provide the optimal solution to the requirements.

PRDs are most frequently written for software products, but they can be used for any type of product and also for services. Typically, a PRD is created from a user's point-of-view by a user/client or a company's marketing department (in the latter case it may also be called a Marketing Requirements Document (MRD)). The requirements are then analyzed by a (potential) maker/supplier from a more technical point of view, broken down and detailed in a Functional Specification (sometimes also called Technical Requirements Document).

The form of the PRD will vary from project to project and depends, for example, on the approach to project implementation. The two most common approaches in software development are the cascading model and agile development methodology. In a cascading development model, product requirements are defined at the very beginning of the project, in their entirety, and development does not begin until they are ready. In the case of an agile development model, requirements are formulated initially at a higher level to allow for prioritization and then elaborated in detail at the beginning of each new cycle.

PRDs also help prevent critical technical issues in software development, including architecture mismatch with product requirements, overlooked technical dependencies, and underestimated implementation complexity.

== Components ==
Typical components of a product requirements document (PRD) are:

- Title & author information
- Purpose and scope, from both a technical and business perspective
- Stakeholder identification
- Market assessment and target demographics
- Product overview and use cases
- Requirements, including
  - functional requirements (e.g. what a product should do)
  - usability requirements
  - technical requirements (e.g. security, network, platform, integration, client)
  - environmental requirements
  - support requirements
  - interaction requirements (e.g. how the product should work with other systems)
- Assumptions
- Constraints
- Dependencies
- High level workflow plans, timelines and milestones (more detail is defined through a project plan)
- Evaluation plan and performance metrics

Not all PRDs have all of these components. In particular, PRDs for other types of products (manufactured goods, etc.) will eliminate the software-specific elements from the list above, and may add in additional elements that pertain to their domain, e.g. manufacturing requirements.

== Common problems in PRD development ==
- User misunderstanding. Without a complete understanding of what the customer wants, it is virtually impossible to create an effective document that meets all of their requirements and expectations.
- Incomplete or inaccurate information - Another challenge is making sure that all the necessary information is included in the product PRD. This includes everything from feature descriptions to performance metrics and should be updated regularly as new information or changes are made.
- Lack of clarity in communicating requirements between stakeholders and users can lead to significant delays and prevent the product from being released on time.
- It is important to set realistic timeframes in the document so that all stakeholders know how long each feature will take to develop before it goes live. Having unrealistic timelines can lead to delays or even outright cancellation of the project.

== See also ==
- Marketing requirements document
- Product planning
- Product design
- Product management
- Requirements
- Requirements management
- User requirements document
