= Class A surface =

Type of surface in automotive design

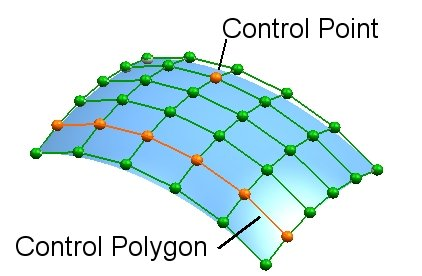
Bézier surface map definition

In automotive design, a class A surface is a freeform surface of high efficiency and quality, in terms of aesthetic reflectivity. Strictly, class A surfaces have curvature and tangency alignment. However, many people interpret class A surfaces to have G2 (or even G3) geometric continuity.

Class A surfacing is done using computer-aided industrial design applications. Class A surface modellers are also called "digital sculptors" in the industry. Industrial designers develop their design styling through the A-Surface, the physical surface the end user can feel, touch, see etc.

A surface being created from curves.

== Application ==
A common method of working is to start with a prototype model and produce smooth mathematical Class A surfaces to describe the product's outer body. From this the production of tools and inspection of finished parts can be carried out. Class A surfacing complements the prototype modelling stage by reducing time and increasing control over design iterations.

Class A surfaces can be defined as any surface, that has styling intent, that is either seen, touched, or both and mathematically meets the definition for Bézier.

=== Automotive design application ===
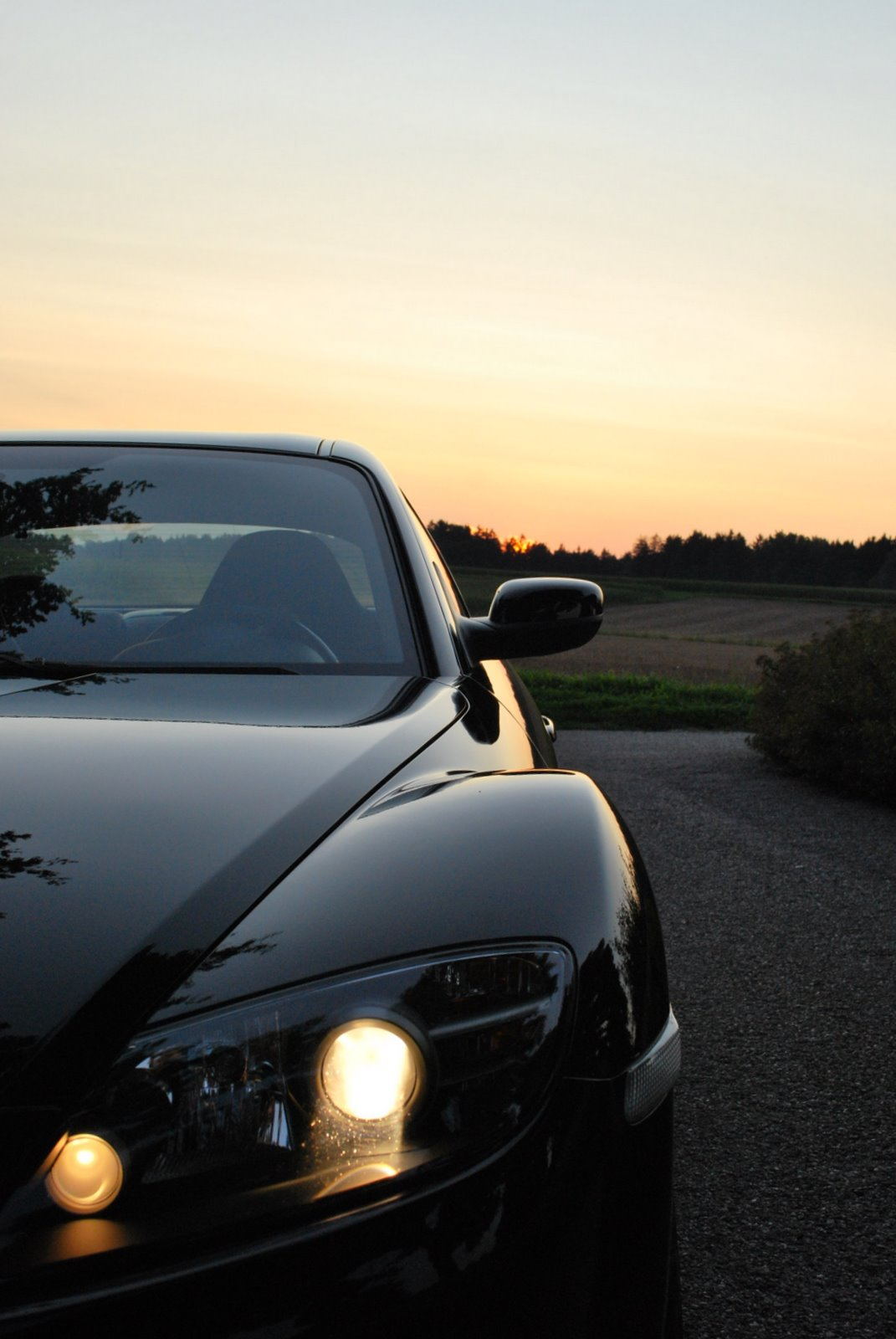
Smooth horizon reflection of Mazda RX-8 is achieved by Class-A surfaces of the fender, bonnet & windscreen as visible in this image

In automotive design application Class A surfaces are created on all visible exterior surfaces (ex; body panels, bumper, grill, lights etc.) and all visible surfaces of see-touch & feel parts in interior (ex: Dashboard, seats, door pads etc.). This can also include beauty covers in the engine compartment, mud flaps, trunk panels and carpeting.

=== Product design application ===
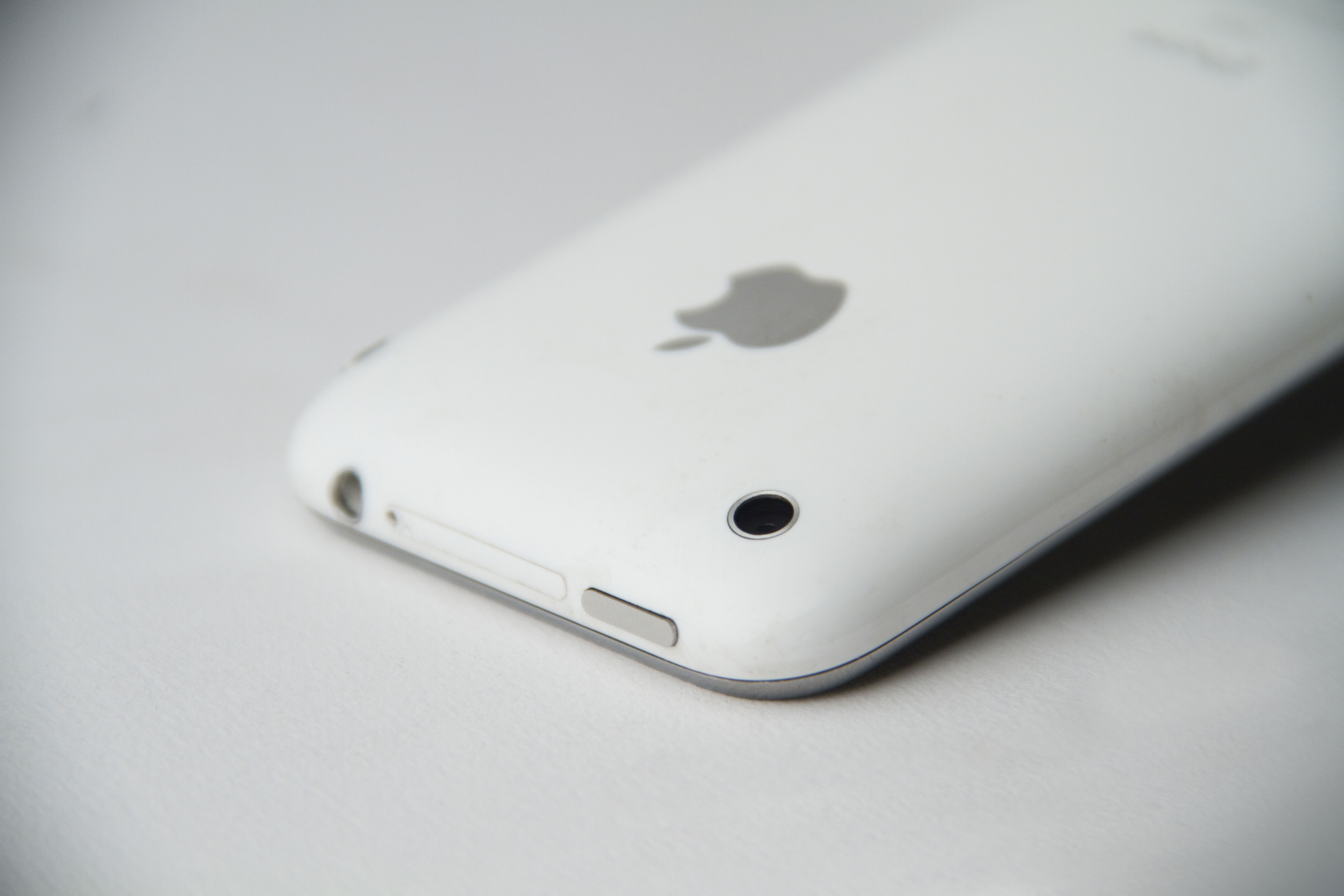
Back surfaces of iPhone 3G. Apple uses Autodesk Alias for all their products

In the product design realm, Class A surfacing can be applied to such things like housing for industrial appliances that are injection moulded, home appliances, highly aesthetic plastic packaging defined by highly organic surfaces, toys or furniture. Among the most famous users of Autodesk Alias software in product design is Apple.

=== Aerospace design application ===
Aerospace has styling and product design considerations in interiors like bezels for air vents and lights, interior roof storage racks, seats and cockpit area etc. In recent years Airbus used ICEM Surf for generating the exterior surface geometry for Aesthetics and Aerodynamic optimisation before delivering the surface to downstream CAD software like CATIA.

=== Clay modelling ===
Class A surfacing / digital sculpting is similar to clay modelling with the added advantage of computing power to change or incorporate design changes in existing/new design. Moreover, the revisions of clay modelling and refinement iteration are carried out in digital version. The scanned data of a selected clay model will be taken as a "Point cloud data" input, and Class A designers work on this Point cloud data to generate preliminary surfaces and further refine them to Class A surfaces.

=== Normalisation ===
Class A surfaces are currently not standardized, a team of French engineers propose a new idea for standardization:

- Class A: G0/G1/G2/G3 – Good aesthetic quality of reflections
- Class B: G0/G1 – Minimal classic quality (G0 = 0,001mm, G1 = 0.2° Max, Undulations Cu = 0.003mm-1, Radius minimum)
- Class C – Surface holes/Bad tangents/Bumps/Undulations...

Class C is a rough, poor surface, which may cause problems in CAM/CAD and not aesthetically. Example characteristics of Class C surfaces are holes (G0), bad tangencies (G1) and micro-bumps that cannot be used for a ball cutter.

Class B is a quality that helps projects to work better CAM/CAD. In Aeronautics, all surfaces must be at least Class B, without holes with good tangencies (G1) and without unusable micro-bumps.

Class A has the qualities of a Class B, but in addition is mainly in G2/G3 curvatures, allowing very beautiful aesthetic reflections, smooth and without cuts. Class A surfaces are often used for mass-produced consumer products such as cars or smart phones.

== Notable software ==
The most widely used software tools are Alias by Autodesk, ICEM Surf a standalone software, ICEM Shape Design and ICEM Shape Design AeroExpert followed by Dassault Systèmes etc integrated in module in CATIA V5.
