= User requirements document =

Software engineering document

The user requirement(s) document (URD) or user requirement(s) specification (URS) is a document usually used in software engineering that specifies what the user expects the software to be able to do.

Once the required information is completely gathered it is documented in a URD, which is meant to spell out exactly what the software must do and becomes part of the contractual agreement. A customer cannot demand features not in the URD, while the developer cannot claim the product is ready if it does not meet an item of the URD.

The URD can be used as a guide for planning cost, timetables, milestones, testing, etc. The explicit nature of the URD allows customers to show it to various stakeholders to make sure all necessary features are described.

Formulating a URD requires negotiation to determine what is technically and economically feasible. Preparing a URD is one of those skills that lies between a science and an art, requiring both software technical skills and interpersonal skills.

== Pharmaceutical Industry Use ==
User Requirement Specifications (URS) are important in the pharmaceutical industry for regulatory and business purposes. URS support regulatory and business considerations for processes, equipment, and systems. For example, a business consideration could be the foot print of equipment prior to installation to ensure there is enough room. Likewise, a regulatory consideration could be the ability for the system to provide an audit trail to ensure the system meets regulatory requirements.

=== URS writing pitfalls ===
Commonly, when companies are purchasing systems, processes, and equipment - not everything is considered. URS ensure everything is considered and the supplier provides the components, features, and design required to meet the company needs. By considering more and having the components, features, and design required, the system, process, or equipment can be aligned with company interests and easily integrated.

== See also ==
- Product requirements document
- Market requirements document
- Requirements management
- Use case
