= Virtual tuning =

Editing images of automobiles

Virtual tuning, colloquially known as 'chopping' or 'VTuning', is the 2D graphical modification of images of automobiles with the use of raster graphics editing software. Modifications such as aerodynamic and aftermarket body-kits, wheels, front mount inter-coolers and carbon fibre body panels, as well as interior or race car modifications, are super-imposed on a stock image in order to increase its aesthetic appeal. Whilst some designs are realistic in nature, one of the reasons why virtual tuners chop is to try modifications that may not be technically feasible if translated to real life . Virtually tuned cars are the complete and comprehensive makeovers of ordinary cars.

== Artists ==
Artists who undertake virtual tuning, usually refer to themselves as 'choppers' though this term is fast disappearing as many try to improve their professional appearance. For the most part, they do it for their own pleasure – as a hobby – however, there is a small percentage of artists who earn an income from their talent.

A large number of choppers come from highly developed economies such as the United States of America, the UK and Australia. However, a majority of choppers stem from European nations such as the Lithuania, Czech Republic, Germany, Poland, Slovakia, Finland, Norway, Sweden, Spain, Portugal, Italy, Hungary, Romania, Turkey, Bulgaria, Croatia, Bosnia, North Macedonia and Serbia as shown by the existence of a number of virtual tuning forums dedicated only speakers of these languages. In addition to this, large numbers of choppers originate from South America, particularly from Brazil and Argentina.

The gender distribution is heavily weighted toward males.

== Popular tools ==
Adobe Photoshop is the tool of choice amongst most choppers. Other raster graphics editing software such as GIMP and Corel Paint Shop are also used by choppers as an alternative to the highly priced Photoshop.

== History ==
Virtual tuning is a relatively new art, gaining popularity since the start of the 21st century. Largely fuelled by progress in computing in the digital era, virtual tuning has become far easier with online tutorials widely accessible. Throughout this time, a large amount of artwork has been produced in this style, with many artists producing technical renders for respected car and automotive tuning companies. When a manufacturer releases speculative artwork of their next model, there is a high probability that the person who produced this artwork was once a member of the ever-growing chopping community. Currently, active choppers are known to have completed promotional imagery for Lexus, Audi, Chevrolet, Volvo, Ferrari, and Ford.

== Internet success ==
Chopping has been prevalent amongst a large variety of automotive based online communities for a number of years. One of the first online forums to feature virtual tuning in some form was GTPlanet, for which a thread was opened in May 2002 and is still currently active.

However, the first mainstream and popular website to feature this type of art as a hobby, was Digimods, which closed down in early 2009. This is known to be the first established international virtual tuning community. Since the opening of Digimods there was a significant gain in interest in the art, with many new websites established such as PS-Garage, which opened its gates in 2004 and was considered home of enthusiasts and designers across the world, in time developing into a more professional approach, having features and appearances in both global newspapers and automotive magazines. Photoshoped^{up}, as well a host of other websites dedicated to speakers of one language, such as Photochoperos (Spain), Sanal Modifiye (Turkey) and VirtualTuning.pl (Poland).

Autemo has gained notoriety as a place to find up and coming talent as well as some of the most respected artists in the style, and often has random user-generated projects and collaboration artwork, often by artists who have established friendships with other artists. Due to its international users, it is seen as the modern day 'home' of Virtual Tuning.

== Competitions ==
=== World Team Battle ===
The concept of the World Team Battle (often referred to as WTB) has virtual tuners competing in teams for their country. The idea originated on the website PhotoshopedUp in 2008, where the competition was moved to PhotochopWorld in 2009 but only the first round was completed. Since 2009 and the subsequent closing of PhotoChopWorld, the World Team Battle has been hosted on autemo. Results for 2008/2009 are unavailable due to the loss of data in the closing of PhotoshopedUp, but the results of WTB 2010 and 2011 are as follows: World Team Battle 2010 Top Four

Country	Placing
Belgium	1st
Slovakia	2nd
Poland	3rd
Germany	4th

World Team Battle 2011 Top Four

Country	Placing
Czech Republic	1st
Poland	2nd
Hungary	Tied 3rd
Turkey	Tied 3rd

=== Other competitions ===
Many Virtual tuning websites will host their own competitions on a regular basis. These typically consist of a base image chosen by either staff on the website or the previous competition's winner. The competitors are then given a period of time to complete a "chop" of this base image and submit it for judging. The contest entries are usually judged by members themselves in a very democratic system, or sometimes by judges given authority due to their expertise in the art.

An example of a competition which follows this basic principle is the Autemo Championship Competitions.

== Careers ==
Choppers do a lot of their artwork simply because they enjoy virtual tuning. However, with the skills built from virtually tuning cars, there are a number of ways artists can make money with their skills. Most advanced choppers have at least once done freelance work for car owners or a design project on Autemo. Some also work for tuning companies, and car magazines.
