= Market requirements document =

A market requirements document (MRD) in project management and systems engineering, is a document that expresses the customer's wants and needs for the product or service. It is typically written as a part of product marketing or product management. The document should explain:

- What (new) product is being discussed
- Who the target customers are
- What products are in competition with the proposed one
- Why customers are likely to want this product.
- What holds the customers back from purchasing the product.

== See also ==
- Product requirements document
- Requirements management
- User requirements document
