= Aggregate project plan =

An aggregate project plan (APP) is the process of creating development goals and objectives and using these goals and objectives to improve productivity as well as development capabilities. The purpose of this process is generally to ensure that each project will accomplish its development goals and objectives. Projects can be differentiated into five types of projects: breakthrough, platform, derivative, R&D, or partnered projects (such as projects performed with partners or business alliances). This differentiation determines a project's development goals and objectives as well as resources allocated to that project.

An aggregate project plan provides management with a categorized list of projects, which balances short- and long-term goals. This list assists management in making difficult decisions such as when to start projects and which projects should be cannibalized. Starting projects in a sequential manner according to the firm's strategy as well as resources available will allow fewer projects to continue simultaneously and improve productivity.

Another benefit is the creation of an organizational form for each project type. This creates a focus on the generation of competence and builds the speed and productivity of individuals as well as the organization itself.

== Aggregate project planning process ==
This is the process a firm undergoes to create an aggregate project plan:

1. Create a well-defined and easily understood strategy.
2. Relay the strategy with the aim of developing new products, processes, or services and improving the efficiency of current projects.
3. Establish clear definitions of each type of project: breakthrough, platform, derivative, R&D, or partnered projects.
4. List current projects and classify each by project type.
5. Eliminate projects that don't fit within a project type.
6. Estimate the average time and resources needed for each project type based on past experience.
7. Determine the desired mix of projects.
8. Identify existing resources and estimate the number of projects those resources can support.
9. Decide which projects to pursue and eliminate the rest.
10. Allocate resources to remaining projects and work to improve development capabilities.

== Five categories of development projects ==
=== Derivative projects ===
Derivative projects can vary from additions or augmentations to existing products or simple price reductions over time. Improvement work on derivative projects falls into three categories, incremental product changes, incremental process changes, and incremental changes in both sectors. Due to these minor changes, derivative projects require trivial effort & resources on both development and management.

Examples: special edition car paint and iPod hard drive size updates
Many organizations make derivative products, which can range from special editions of existing cars, adding nothing more than a special paint scheme and interior or a new iPod with a large hard drive.

=== Platform projects ===
These projects are the next generation of products for the company. These are major changes from existing products/services or the way the product/service is made or delivered. These create a new ‘platform‘ for growth in the future. These projects offer significant improvements in cost, quality, and performance. Platforms are created to meet the needs of a core group of customers changing more than one aspect of a product or service; while derivatives normally only change one aspect of a product or service.

Examples: new car models. Microprocessor
New car models have major changes in a number of areas which include manufacturing and product changes when they are released creating a platform for the car company. A new microprocessor with changes in speed, size, and capabilities, while having a new process to create them, adds a new platform for the company.

=== Breakthrough Projects ===
These projects are the highest risk and the highest reward category. These involve the newest technology greater than that of a platform project. This use of this technology may be ‘disruptive’ to the rest of the industry and create an entirely new product category to define the industry. This may be a brand new technology or significant changes to existing projects. These types of projects often incorporate new and innovative manufacturing or servicing processes. These types of projects should be given leeway to work outside of normal and existing operating techniques.

Examples: fiber optic data transfer, hybrid cars
Fiber optic data transfer cables revolutionized the industry of data transfer. This new technology was a breakthrough in the industry with lines of dark fiber laid though many major cities. Hybrid cars are the first types of cars not to rely solely on the use of fossil fuels.

=== Research and development ===
The invention of new materials and technologies that will be used in commercial development. R&D projects are high-risk endeavors with the possibility of high returns. It always occurs before product and process development. R&D projects also use the same resources as commercial development and will always compete for them. Every organization has different expectations for R&D projects due to its high possibility of failure.

Example: 3D Television
An example of an R&D project would be a Television company attempting to develop a new, 3D viewing system for consumers. This would require extensive research & development that would have a high up-front cost and possible return with a large risk of failure.

=== Partnered projects ===
These projects can fall under any of the other four categories. However, these projects can often be overlooked while mapping the aggregate project plan. These plans are important and their resource usage should be included in planning.

Example: Pepsi and Starbucks
Starbucks has an agreement that Pepsi will bottle their beverages they sell in retail sources. This is a partnership between both companies that neither can ignore and the resources should be accounted for.
