= Product concept =

Initial description of a product or service

A product concept is a description of a product or service, at an early stage in the product lifecycle. It is generated before any detailed design work is undertaken and takes into consideration market analysis, customer experience, product features, product cost, strategic fit, and product architecture.

A product concept should describe how the new product will appeal to its target market. While the product concept is based upon the idea that customers prefer products that have the most quality, performance, and features, some customers prefer a product that is simpler and easier to use.

== See also ==
- Product lifecycle
- Product development
