= Product marketing =

Product marketing is a "core business function that plans and executes how a product is positioned, priced, and promoted to a defined audience. It aims to generate demand and support sustainable growth through activities such as positioning, packaging, and pricing, and go-to-market execution," as stated by A.H. Mujumder.

Product marketing is also a subfield of marketing that is responsible for crafting the promotion of a product. Product marketing managers can also be involved in defining and sizing target markets. They collaborate with other stakeholders, including business development, sales, and technical functions such as product management and engineering. Other critical responsibilities include positioning and sales enablement.

Product marketing deals with marketing the product to prospects, customers, and others. Product marketing works with other areas of marketing such as social media marketing, marketing communications, online marketing, advertising, marketing strategy, and public relations to execute outbound marketing for their product.

== Relationship to other roles ==
Product marketing is generally different from product management. The product marketing manager creates a market requirements document (MRD) and gives it to the Product Managers. The product manager then gathers the product requirements and creates a product requirements document (PRD). After that, product managers give the PRD to the engineering team.

These roles may vary across companies. In some cases, product management creates both the MRD and the PRD, while product marketing does outbound tasks. Outbound tasks may include trade show product demonstrations and marketing collateral (hot-sheets, beat-sheets, cheat sheets, data sheets and white papers). These tasks require skills in competitor analysis, market research, technical writing, financial matters (ROI and NPV analyses) and product positioning. Product marketer's typical performance indicators include feature adoption, new revenue, expansion revenue, and churn rate.

Product marketers are responsible for creating content for various purposes including sales, marketing, communications, customer engagement, and reviewers. In most cases, the existence of collaborative consumption leads to a decrease in product marketers' profits. On the other hand, consumers who share their goods in a sharing-based market are more willing to pay more for a higher quality product than if they were not in a sharing-based market.

== Qualifications ==
The standard educational requirement to become a product manager is a marketing or business degree. This can include a Bachelor of Business Administration (BBA), Master of Business Administration (MBA), Master of Arts (M.A.) or Master of Science (M.S.) in Marketing, and Master of Arts (M.A.) or Master of Science (M.S.) in Industrial-Organizational (I/O) Psychology. A focus in advertising, public relations, communications, graphic design, and other related fields is helpful.

Real-world work experience in related disciplines will help improve qualifications.

Effectively communicating in a second language can be seen as an invaluable asset for those working on a project with global or wide-scale implications. Additionally, some journals have stated that a useful qualification for product managers is having a background in engineering or computing because it allows for easier interaction with the technical staff.

== Essential Components in Product Marketing ==
Product Marketing "refers to the activities, strategies, and techniques used to promote a product or service and bring it to market." Product Marketing requires an understanding of the product being sold and the market that is buying this product. This process includes "understanding market trends, target audience identification, product positioning, and brand messaging." Recognizing customer behavior is part of understanding market trends. Identifying what parts of the market are most likely to buy this product is targeting, and product positioning means creating a product that is different from others. "Brand messaging involves developing a clear form of communication that targets certain markets."

== Global Product Market ==
Global Marketing requires a strategy to brand message, taking into consideration culture, regulations, and consumer needs. The global market involves the exchange of goods, services, and labor anywhere in the world. For example, businesses located in the United States purchase parts and components for one of its products from Japan, South Korea, Germany, and Mexico. The United States also trades products to other countries, such as crude oil, soybeans, wheat, automobiles, machinery, clothing, and jewelry. Researching and analysis, targeting an audience, positioning a product, branding message, targeting certain markets, and gathering data to determine if this product is successful are all strategies global marketing incorporates.

== How Does Product Strategy Help Achieve Market Success? ==
According to the research conducted by the Kellogg School of Management at Northwestern, there are three valuable business purposes for why product strategy is important.

1. "A product strategy provides clarity for your company." It is essential that, in order to deliver your best work, communication must be clear and well thought out. There should be goals set, and the marketing team needs to list the product's benefits
2. "It helps you prioritize your product road map." After the proposal has been agreed on, it is time to develop an action plan. After the plan has been developed, the team must have a clear vision of what needs to be accomplished.
3. "A product strategy improves your team's tactical decisions." That means that even if the team has a clear vision or road map, it is important to be able to be flexible and make changes along the way if necessary.

After the Product Marketing team has established the Product strategy, they should "bridge your product vision and the tactical steps to fulfill that mission." Several questions should be answered by the marketing team: "What problems will our product solve for these personas? How will our product differentiate itself and win the market? What are our near-term and long-term goals for this product? Once these questions are answered by the Product Marketing team, then developing a project timeline can begin to materialize.

== Bibliography ==
- Bodlaj, & Čater, B. (2022). Responsive and proactive market orientation in relation to SMEs’ export venture performance: The mediating role of marketing capabilities. Journal of Business Research, 138, 256–265. https://doi.org/10.1016/j.jbusres.2021.09.034
- Moon. (2020). The Strategic Impact of Collaborative Consumption on Product Marketers. eScholarship, University of California.
