= Total pressure =

Total pressure may mean:

- Total pressure (gases)
- Total pressure (fluids)
