= Biharmonic Bézier surface =

A biharmonic Bézier surface is a smooth polynomial surface which conforms to the biharmonic equation and has the same formulations as a Bézier surface. This formulation for Bézier surfaces was developed by Juan Monterde and Hassan Ugail. In order to generate a biharmonic Bézier surface four boundary conditions defined by Bézier control points are usually required.

It has been shown that given four boundary conditions a unique solution to the chosen general fourth order elliptic partial differential equation can be formulated. Biharmonic Bézier surfaces are related to minimal surfaces. i.e. surfaces that minimise the area among all the surfaces with prescribed boundary data.
