= Totally positive matrix =

Type of array in math

In mathematics, a totally positive matrix is a square matrix in which all the minors are positive: that is, the determinant of every square submatrix is a positive number. A totally positive matrix has all entries positive, so it is also a positive matrix; and it has all principal minors positive (and positive eigenvalues). A symmetric totally positive matrix is therefore also positive-definite. A totally non-negative matrix is defined similarly, except that all the minors must be non-negative (positive or zero). Some authors use "totally positive" to include all totally non-negative matrices.

== Definition ==
Let $\mathbf{A} = (A_{ij})_{ij}$ be an n × n matrix. Consider any $p\in\{1,2,\ldots,n\}$ and any p × p submatrix of the form $\mathbf{B} = (A_{i_kj_\ell})_{k\ell}$ where:

$$1\le i_1 < \ldots < i_p \le n,\qquad 1\le j_1 <\ldots <  j_p \le n.$$

Then A is a totally positive matrix if:

$$\det(\mathbf{B}) > 0$$

for all submatrices $\mathbf{B}$ that can be formed this way.

== History ==
Topics which historically led to the development of the theory of total positivity include the study of:

- the spectral properties of kernels and matrices which are totally positive,
- ordinary differential equations whose Green's function is totally positive, which arises in the theory of mechanical vibrations (by M. G. Krein and some colleagues in the mid-1930s),
- the variation diminishing properties (started by I. J. Schoenberg in 1930),
- Pólya frequency functions (by I. J. Schoenberg in the late 1940s and early 1950s).

== Examples ==
Theorem. (Gantmacher, Krein, 1941) If $0 < x_0 < \dots < x_n$ are positive real numbers, then the Vandermonde matrix
$$V = V(x_0, x_1, \cdots, x_n) =
\begin{bmatrix}
1 & x_0 & x_0^2 & \dots & x_0^n\\
1 & x_1 & x_1^2 & \dots & x_1^n\\
1 & x_2 & x_2^2 & \dots & x_2^n\\
\vdots & \vdots & \vdots & \ddots &\vdots \\
1 & x_n & x_n^2 & \dots & x_n^n
\end{bmatrix}$$
is totally positive.

More generally, let $\alpha_0 < \dots < \alpha_n$ be real numbers, and let $0 < x_0 < \dots < x_n$ be positive real numbers, then the generalized Vandermonde matrix $V_{ij} = x_i^{\alpha_j}$ is totally positive.

Proof (sketch). It suffices to prove the case where $\alpha_0 = 0, \dots, \alpha_n = n$.

The case where $0 \leq \alpha_0 < \dots < \alpha_n$ are rational positive real numbers reduces to the previous case. Set $p_i / q_i = \alpha_i$, then let $x'_i := x_i^{1/q_i}$. This shows that the matrix is a minor of a larger Vandermonde matrix, so it is also totally positive.

The case where $0 \leq \alpha_0 < \dots < \alpha_n$ are positive real numbers reduces to the previous case by taking the limit of rational approximations.

The case where $\alpha_0 < \dots < \alpha_n$ are real numbers reduces to the previous case. Let $\alpha_i' = \alpha_i - \alpha_0$, and define $V_{ij}' = x_i^{\alpha_j'}$. Now by the previous case, $V'$ is totally positive by noting that any minor of $V$ is the product of a diagonal matrix with positive entries, and a minor of $V'$, so its determinant is also positive.

For the case where $\alpha_0 = 0, \dots, \alpha_n = n$, see (Fallat & Johnson 2011, p. 74).

== See also ==
- Compound matrix
