= Variation diminishing property =

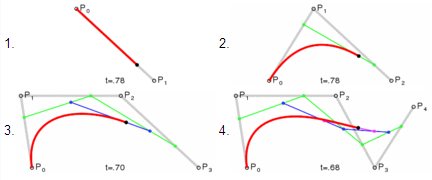
Sample curves (red) with their polygons (grey).

In mathematics, the variation diminishing property of certain mathematical objects involves diminishing the number of changes in sign (positive to negative or vice versa).

== Variation diminishing property for Bézier curves ==
The variation diminishing property of Bézier curves is that they are smoother than the polygon formed by their control points. If a line is drawn through the curve, the number of intersections with the curve will be less than or equal to the number of intersections with the control polygon. In other words, for a Bézier curve $\mathbf{B}$ defined by the control polygon $\mathbf{P}$, the curve will have no more intersection with any plane as that plane has with $\mathbf{P}$. This may be generalised into higher dimensions.

This property was first studied by Isaac Jacob Schoenberg in his 1930 paper, Über variationsvermindernde lineare Transformationen. He went on to derive it by a transformation of Descartes's rule of signs.

=== Proof ===
The proof uses the process of repeated degree elevation of Bézier curve. The process of degree elevation for Bézier curves can be considered an instance of piecewise linear interpolation. Piecewise linear interpolation can be shown to be variation diminishing. Thus, if $\mathbf{R}_1$, $\mathbf{R}_2$, $\mathbf{R}_3$, and so on denote the set of polygons obtained by the degree elevation of the initial control polygon $\mathbf{R}$, then it can be shown that

- $\lim_{r \to \infty}\mathbf{R}_r = \mathbf{B}$; and
- Each $\mathbf{R}_r$ has fewer intersections with a given plane than $\mathbf{R}_{r-1}$ (since degree elevation is a form of linear interpolation which can be shown to follow the variation diminishing property).

Using the above points, we say that since the Bézier curve $\mathbf{B}$ is the limit of these polygons as $r$ approaches $\infty$, it will have fewer intersections with a given plane than $\mathbf{R}_i$ for all $i$, and in particular fewer intersections that the original control polygon $\mathbf{R}$. This is the statement of the variation diminishing property.

== Totally positive matrices ==
The variation diminishing property of totally positive matrices is a consequence of their decomposition into products of Jacobi matrices.

The existence of the decomposition follows from the Gauss–Jordan triangulation algorithm. It follows that we need only prove the VD property for a Jacobi matrix.

The blocks of Dirichlet-to-Neumann maps of planar graphs have the variation diminishing property.
