= Bernoulli grip =

Type of pneumatic gripping device

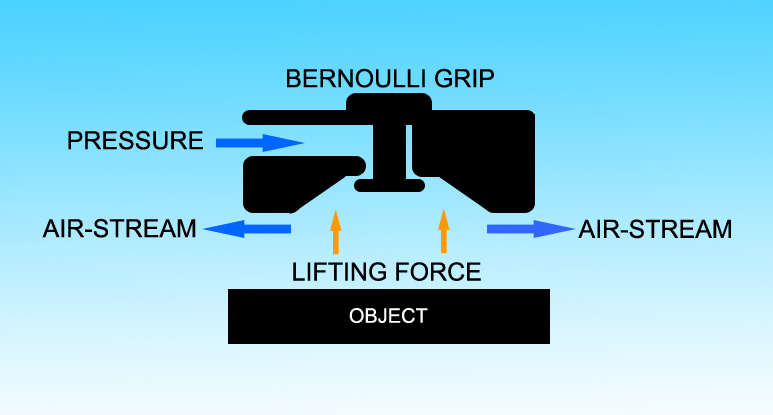
The flow of air causes a lifting force on the object, allowing for non-contact adhesion

A Bernoulli grip is a subtype of the Air-Flow (Air-Jet) type of the pneumatic gripping devices, which uses airflow to lift an object without physical contact. Such grippers rely on the Bernoulli airflow principle. While an accelerating, increasing speed, airstream has a low downstream static pressure, the sharp turn from linear to radial flow is the cause of a region of very low pressure around the blower exit hole. This is the cause of a net force on the object in the direction normal to the side with higher local pressure. A Bernoulli gripper takes advantage of this by maintaining this negative pressure at the gripper face compared to the ambient pressure below the sample, while maintaining an air gap between the gripper and the object being held. There are two main subtypes of Bernoulli grippers that have the greatest differences in both design and characteristics: nozzle with a developed surface of the end face (Bernoulli gripping device with a cylindrical nozzle) and the Ejection Bernoulli gripping device.

Subtypes of Bernoulli grippers
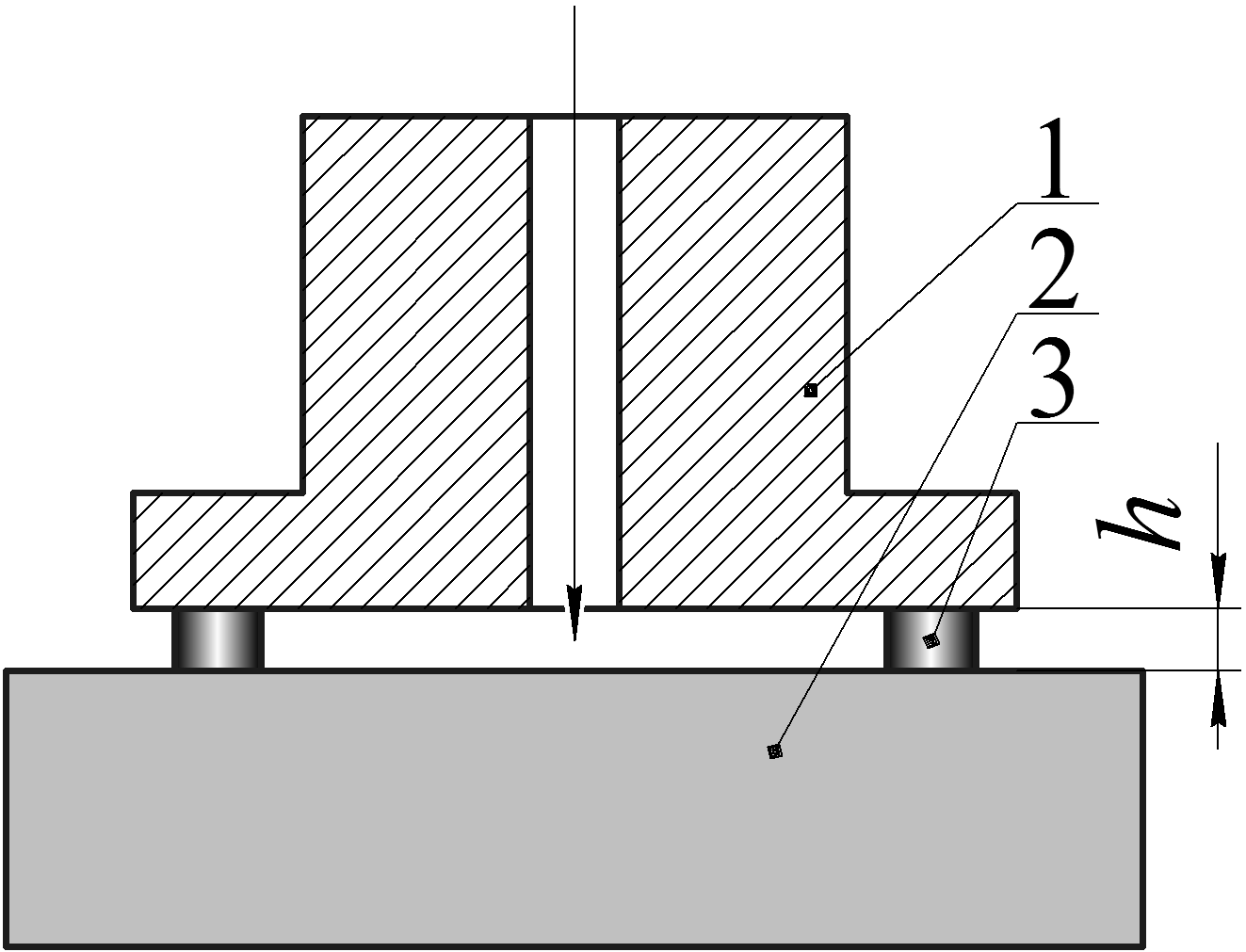
Diagram of a nozzle with a developed surface of the end face (Bernoulli gripping device with a cylindrical nozzle), where 1 - gripper body, 2 - object, and 3 - friction elements.

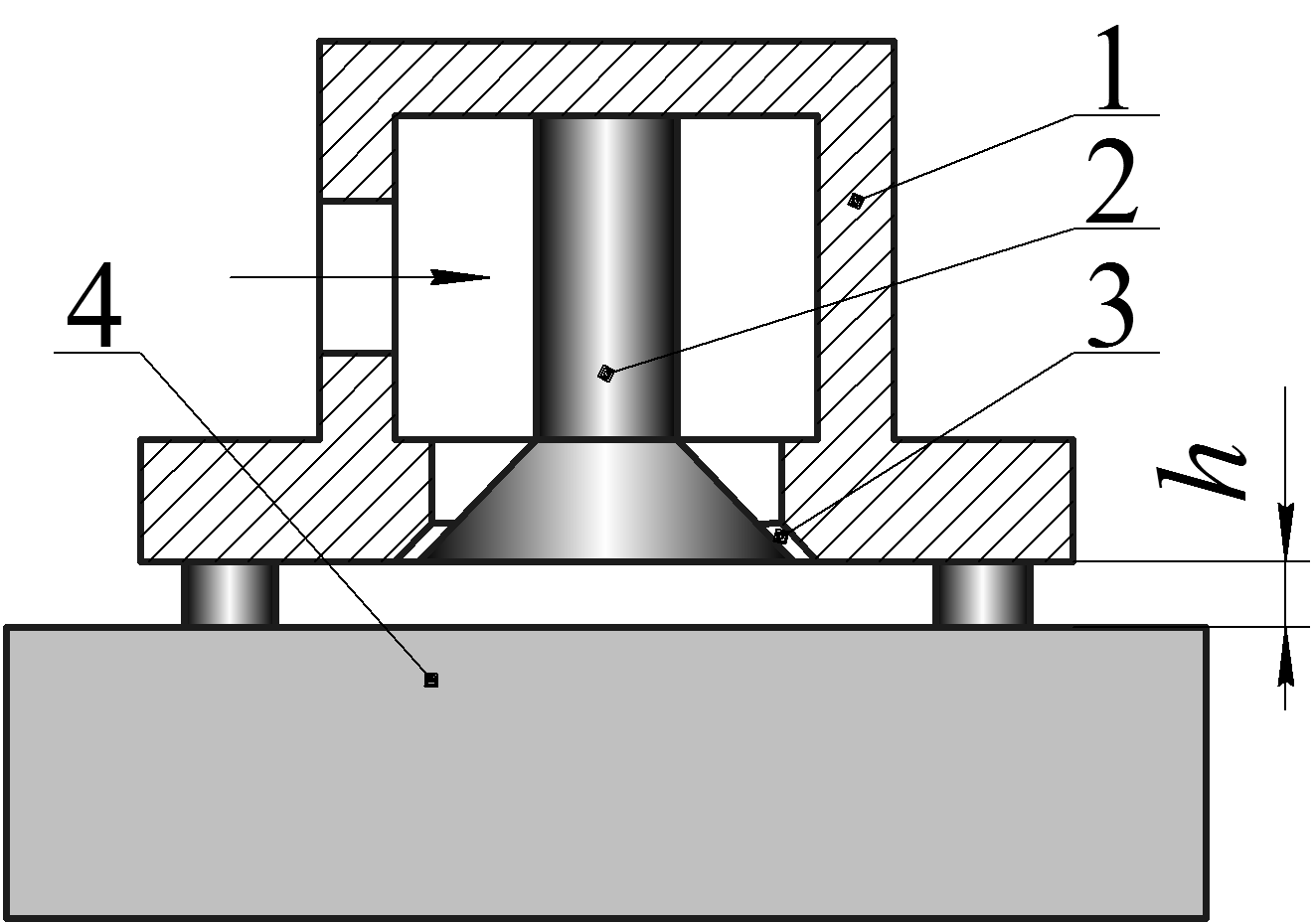
Diagram of the Ejection Bernoulli gripping device, where 1 - gripper body, 2 - conical insert, 3 - circular nozzle, and 4 - object.

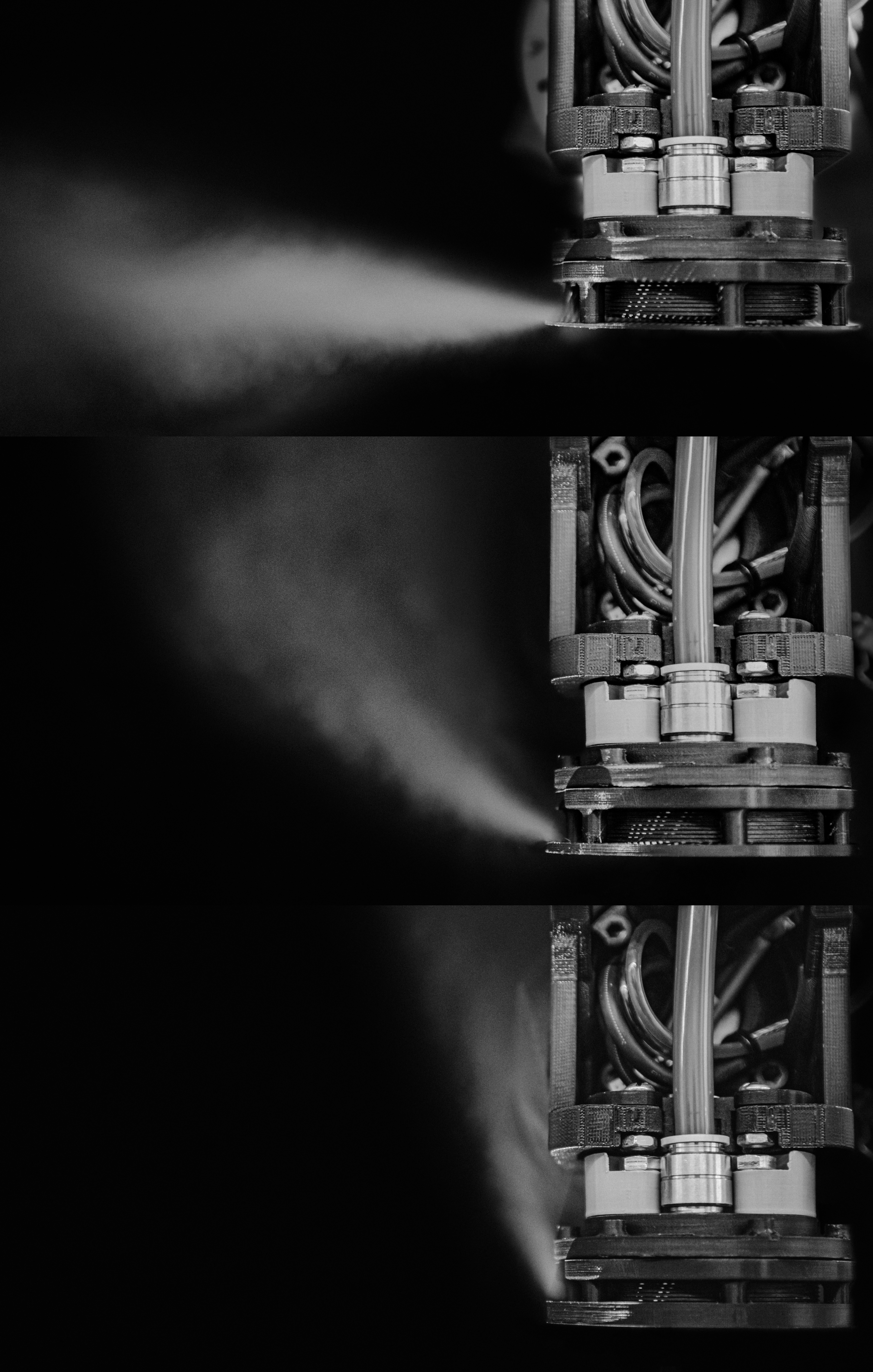
Smoked air-flow of modified Bernoulli-based gripper for grasping textile materials. By redirecting air flows, it is possible to eliminate vibration of materials during their grasping and manipulation by robots.

== Applications ==
Commercially available Bernoulli grips are commonly used to handle rigid sheet like material such as silicon wafers in circuit board manufacturing, or photovoltaic cell components. Since the grip is contactless, this form of gripping lends itself to handling sterile material to prevent chemical and/or biological contamination. Research has been done into using Bernoulli grippers to transport sample sheet foodstuffs in a food processing context, although this work found difficulties as the flexible foods would vibrate against the gripper, deforming and alternately blocking the gripper and/or being blown away from the airway. However, the addition of an anti-vibration grid to the gripper design allowed the use of this technology for grasping textile objects. Further, the surface of the anti-vibration grid was optimized to increase the lifting force and completely remove the vibration of the grasping material. The Bernoulli grip is also being investigated as a non-contact adhesion mechanism for wall-climbing robots.
