= List of New York Institute of Technology faculty =

The following is a list of some notable current and former faculty of New York Institute of Technology.

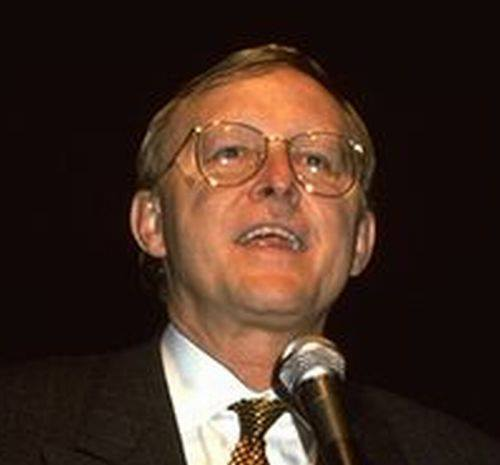
James H. Clark, computer scientist; founded companies including Netscape Communications Corporation

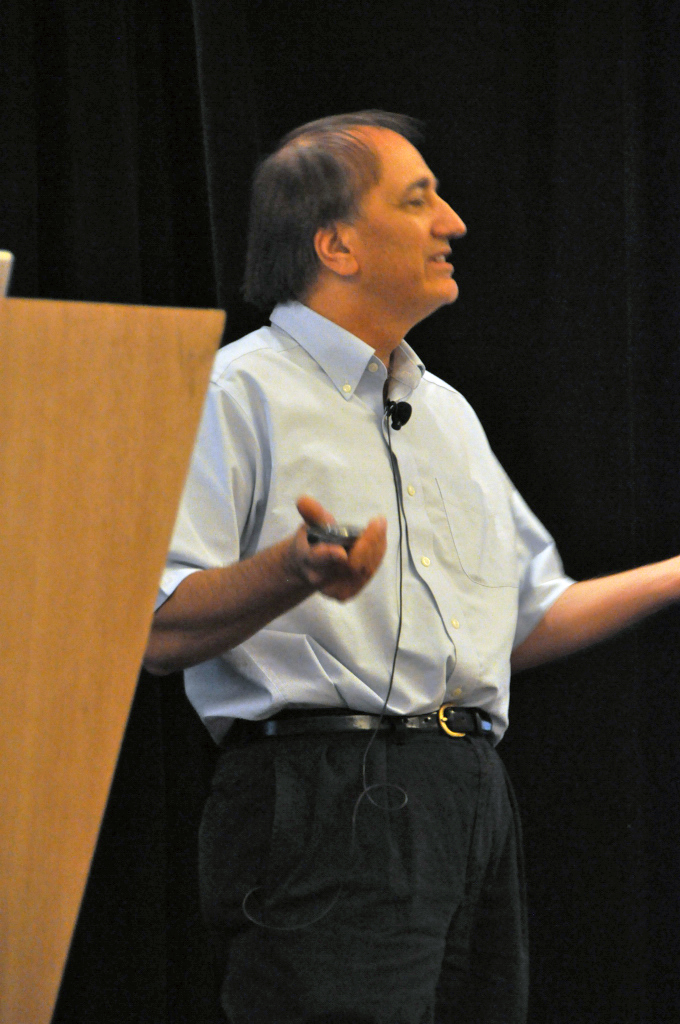
Pat Hanrahan, computer scientist; Turing Award and several Academy Awards winner

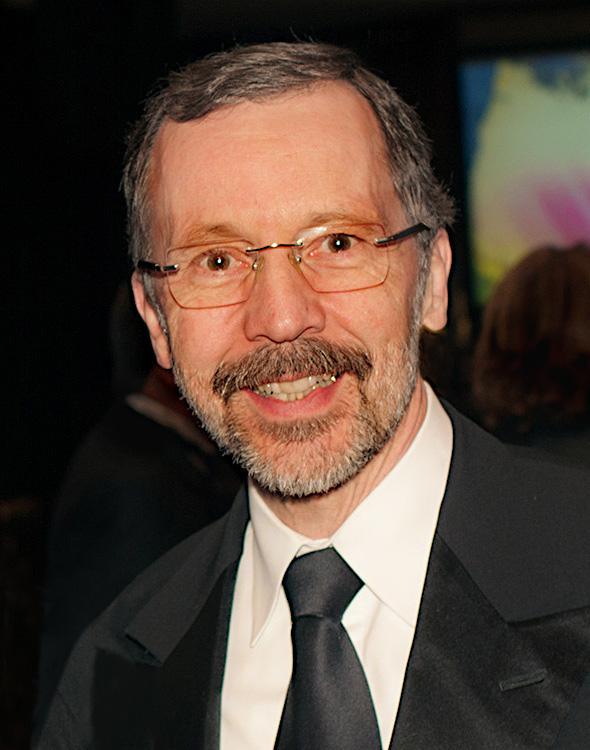
Edwin Catmull, computer scientist and president of Pixar Animation Studios and Walt Disney Animation Studios; Turing Award and several Academy Awards winner

- Reino Aarnio, architect
- Rebecca Allen, artist
- Ernie Anastos, won 28 Emmy Awards and nominations; nominated for the Edward R. Murrow Award for excellence in writing
- Myrna Bain, political activist, grass-roots organizer, scholar and writer
- Phyllis Birkby, architect, feminist, filmmaker, teacher
- Jim Blinn, computer scientist known for his work as a computer graphics expert at NASA's Jet Propulsion Laboratory
- Harvey Jerome Brudner, theoretical physicist/engineer
- Carter Burwell, composer of film scores
- Frank Catalanotto, baseball coach
- Edwin Catmull, computer scientist and president of Pixar Animation Studios and Walt Disney Animation Studios; Turing Award winner
- Tyler Cymet, physician; discovered Erondu–Cymet syndrome
- James H. Clark, entrepreneur and computer scientist, founded companies, including Netscape Communications Corporation
- Terese Coe, writer, translator, and dramatist
- Evan Conti (born 1993), American-Israeli basketball player and coach
- Franklin C. Crow, computer scientist
- James DeWoody, painter, printmaker, and sculptor
- David DiFrancesco, photoscientist, inventor, cinematographer, and photographer
- Leonard Dinnerstein, historian and author
- Tony DiSpigna, type designer and graphic designer
- Tom Duff, computer programmer
- Ed Emshwiller, visual artist
- Sheldon D. Fields, scientist
- Hank Foley, scientist
- Fran Fraschilla (born 1958), assistant basketball coach at NYIT; basketball commentator and former college basketball coach
- Bernard Fryshman, physicist
- Frank Genese, architect
- Norman Gevitz, medical sociologist and historian
- Andrew Glassner, expert in computer graphics
- Francis Glebas, keynote speaker, writer, film director, storyboard artist, and teacher; Aladdin, The Lion King, Pocahontas, The Hunchback of Notre Dame, Dinosaur, Hercules, Treasure Planet, Fantasia 2000, Piglet's Big Movie, Space Chimps, Rio and Ice Age: Continental Drift
- William E. Glenn, inventor known for his contributions to imaging technology; was awarded 136 U.S. patents
- Ralph Guggenheim, video graphics designer
- Edward Guiliano, author
- William L. Haney, painter
- Pat Hanrahan, computer graphics researcher, Turing Award winner
- Harriet Harriss, UK-licensed architect, writer, and historian
- Harry Hurwitz, film director, screenwriter, actor and producer
- Alicia L. Hyndman, assembly member for the 29th District of the New York State Assembly
- Omar Imady, scholar, novelist, and poet
- Mehrdad Izady, contemporary writer on ethnic and cultural topics, particularly the Greater Middle East, and Kurds
- Peter G. Jordan, educator
- Barbara Judge, chairman emeritus of the UK Atomic Energy Authority
- Manfred Kirchheimer, documentary film maker
- Stephen A. Lesser, architect
- John Lewis, computer scientist
- Alexandra W. Logue, behavioral scientist
- Bob Malvagna, college baseball coach
- Jerry W. McDaniel, heterogeneous artist, graphics artist, illustrator, communication designer, and modernist painter
- Alessandro Melis, Italian architect and the curator of the Italian National Pavilion at the 17th Venice Biennale
- Frank Mruk, architect, author, artist and researcher
- Frederic Parke, creator of the first CG physically modeled human face
- Bruce Perens, computer programmer and advocate in the free software movement
- Michael Rees, artist practicing sculpture making, installation, animation, and interactive computing
- Aaron Resnick, structural engineer and architect
- W. Kenneth Riland, osteopathic physician (D.O.) whose patients included President Richard Nixon and Nelson A. Rockefeller
- Lynn Rogoff, film and television producer, and stage playwright, theatre director and professor
- Stefan Roloff, painter, video artist, filmmaker, and pioneer of digital video and photography
- Barbara Ross-Lee, physician, academic, first African-American woman to serve as dean of a U.S. medical school; sister of Diana Ross; aunt of actress Tracee Ellis Ross, and singer-songwriters Rhonda Ross Kendrick and Evan Ross
- Han Schröder, Dutch architect and educator
- Alexander Schure, academic and entrepreneur
- Matthew Schure, educational psychologist, professor
- Rahmat Shoureshi, scientist
- Alvy Ray Smith, pioneer in computer graphics
- Joel B. Snyder, Institute of Electrical and Electronics Engineers president
- Roberto FE Soto, communicator and educator; specializes in academia and media, startups, and turnaround projects
- Jacques Stroweis, visual effects artist and computer scientist
- Elliot Tiber, artist, professor, and screenwriter
- Lance Williams, graphics researcher
- Morrie Yohai, food company executive best known for his creation of Cheez Doodles
