= Harriet Harris =

Harriet Harris may refer to:

- Harriet Sansom Harris (born 1955), American actor
- Harriet Harris (academic) (born 1968), English theologian and Anglican priest

== See also ==
- Harriet Harriss (born 1973), British architect
