= Mruk =

Mruk is a Polish surname. Notable people with the surname include:

- Frank Mruk, American architect
- Joseph Mruk (1903–1995), American politician
- Mirosław Mruk (born 1962), Polish rower
