= LoVecchio =

LoVecchio is a surname. Notable people with the surname include:

- Frankie Laine (born Francesco LoVecchio, 1913–2007), American singer, songwriter, and actor
- Jeff LoVecchio (born 1985), American ice hockey player
- Matt LoVecchio (born 1982), American football player
- Frank LoVecchio, American physician and toxicologist

== See also ==
- Andrea Lo Vecchio
