= Entrepreneurship and Technology Innovation Center =

Center at the New York Institute of Technology

Coordinates: 40°48′49″N 73°36′15″W

- Established: 2015
- Director: Michael Nizich, PhD
- Location: Old Westbury, New York, US
- Website: Official website

The Entrepreneurship and Technology Innovation Center, otherwise known as ETIC, is an 8,000 square feet industry-funded research center created to promote research development, innovation and entrepreneurship at the New York Institute of Technology.

== History ==
The center was constructed with both state and federal funding. It opened in 2015.

In 2021, NASA contracted with the Entrepreneurship and Technology Innovation Center (ETIC) to have ETIC student employees develop and fabricate novel technology prototypes using the NASA patents. Student employees also create marketing materials for NASA commercialization efforts. An interdisciplinary team of NYIT students is working to create prototypes for NASA technologies, including a robotic therapy vest for patients with neurological impairments and a high-tech device, known as a C-gauge, to measure cord tension in parachutes, sails, and weather balloons.

== Features and facilities ==
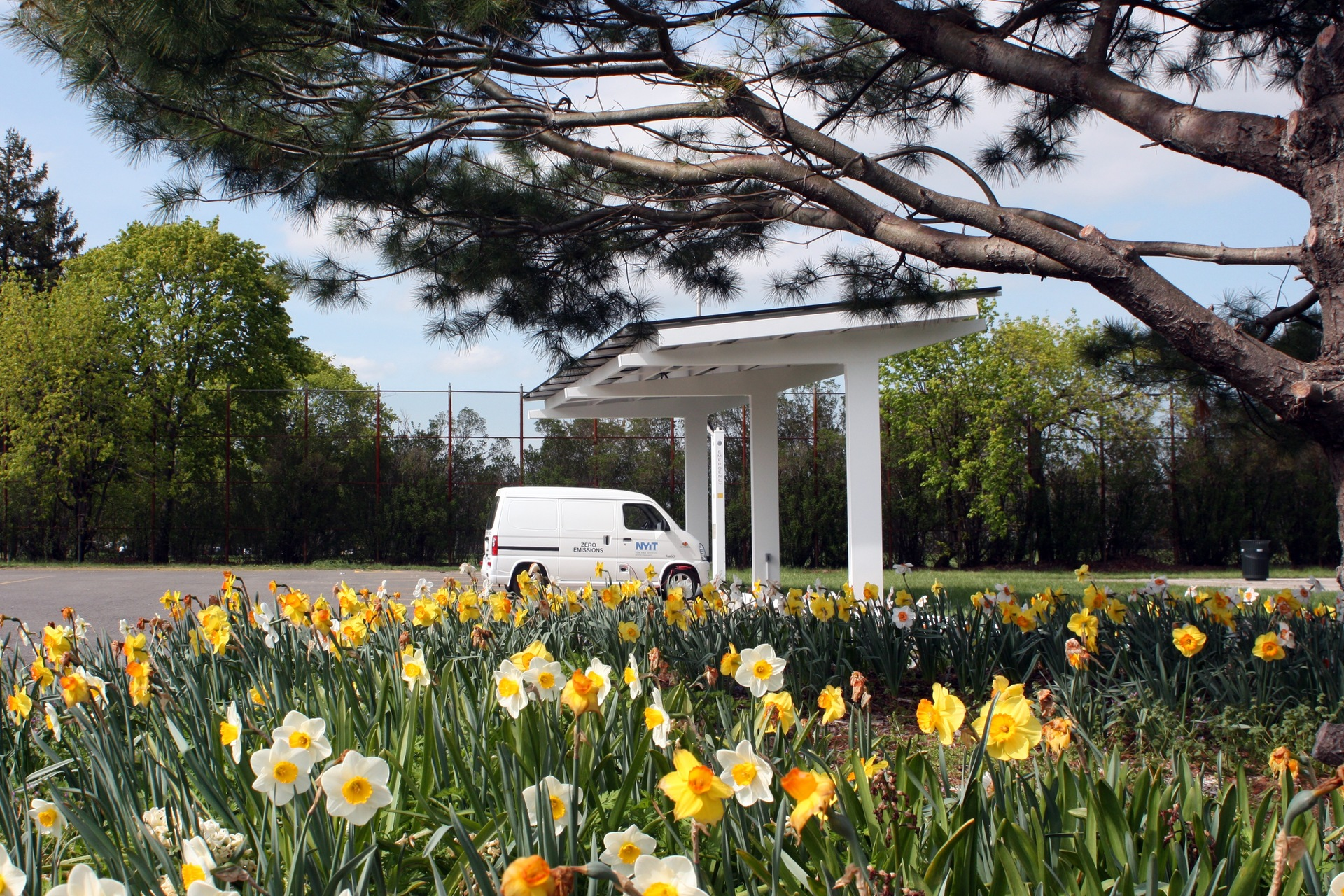
A solar electric vehicle charging station at the New York Institute of Technology.

The ETIC comprises 8,000 square feet including academic working and laboratory space, conference and training rooms, collaborative fabrication and maker space, a smart 100-seat auditorium and a dedicated Data Center.

Various testing and research labs available to ETIC researchers throughout New York Tech include:

- Cybersecurity Lab
- Energy and Green Technologies Lab
- Renewable Energy Telemetry Lab
- Bio-engineering and Medical Devices Lab
- Fabrication and Rapid Prototyping Lab
- Nanofabrication Facility
- OSHA Hazardous Waste Operations Facility
- Materials Lab
- Aerodynamics Lab
- Instrumentation and Measurement Lab
- Thermo-Fluid Lab
- Mechanical CAD/CAM Lab
- Geographical Information Systems Lab
- Microprocessor-Based Systems Development Lab
- Class 10,000 Clean Room
- Motion Capture Lab

== See also ==
- NASA spin-off technologies
