= Myrna Bain =

American political activist (1939–2007)

Myrna Bain (November 27, 1939 – April 12, 2007) born Myrna Delores Bain, was an American political activist, grass-roots organizer, scholar and writer. She was an influential member of several organizations founded by LGBTI women of color, most notably Kitchen Table: Women of Color Press (with Audre Lorde, Cherrie Moraga and Hattie Gossett).

== Personal life ==
Bain was born in Florida and, along with many Black families, moved north during the Great African-American migration. Her family ultimately settled in the Bronx. Her parents divorced but were active in her upbringing. Bain had a sibling, Julian Bain (d. 2007).

Her early years were spent in one of the numerous wood-frame homes owned by working class African Americans. Upon the initiation of the Robert Moses public works project, her home was razed and her family relocated to a Bronx-based housing project. This event would influence Bain's work throughout her career.

Bain was an initiated priestess in the Afro-Cuban religion Lucumí, also known as Santería, and presided as initiatory godmother, or "iyalorisha", to many practitioners. Bain's tutelary orisha was Aganju, and she was initiated in a process known as "Shango oro Aganju" and given the orisha name "Ilari Oba".

== Career ==
=== Activism ===
Starting out in the 1960s, Bain was active in the Black power movement, at different times being connected to the Black Panther Party and the Freedom Summer movement. The most mainstream political period for Bain involved a stint as a public relations operative for the Republican Party (Publicity Director for the Minorities Division of the Republican National Committee). Bain always maintained that she did this period of work to "know how the other side worked".

=== Academia ===
Bain was also a professor of Black Studies for the City University of New York for several decades (at Hunter College, John Jay College of Criminal Justice and New York Institute of Technology). The Myrna Bain Scholarship at John Jay College is dedicated to her memory.

Bain was also influential as the teacher of many published feminist writers in the United States and internationally, including Dorothea Smartt, Donna Aza-Weir Soley, Tracie Morris, and Marianne Goodreax-Fielder. Bain was an active writer who associated with Amiri Baraka, Quincy Troupe, Audre Lorde, and James Baldwin.
