= Bob Malvagna =

Playing career
- 1975–1979: St. John's

Coaching career (HC unless noted)
- 2001–2010: Adelphi (Asst.)
- 2011: Nassau (Asst.)
- 2012: Queensborough (Asst.)
- 2013–2018: NYIT

Head coaching record
- Overall: 63–210–2

Bob Malvagna in an American college baseball coach and former player. Malvanga played college baseball at St. John's University from 1975 to 1979 for head coach Joe Russo. He served as head baseball coach for the New York Institute of Technology from 2013 to 2018.

Malvagna played for St. John's from 1975 through 1979, and appeared in the 1978 College World Series with the Redmen. In 2001, Malvagna became an assistant coach at Adelphi, serving as hitting and third base coach and later adding associate head coach duties. He helped lead the Panthers to five winning seasons and a pair of NCAA Division II regional appearances. In 2011, Malvagna served as an assistant at Nassau Community College in East Garden City, New York. He spent the 2012 season at Queensborough Community College before being hired as head coach of the Bears in 2013.

== Head coaching record ==
Record table
| Season | Team | Overall | Conference | Standing | Postseason |
|---|---|---|---|---|---|
NYIT (Great West Conference) (2013)
| 2013 | NYIT | 10–47 | 8–20 | 7th (8) | Great West Tournament (Note: All eight of the Great West's teams qualified for the tournament in 2013.) |
| NYIT (GWC): | | 10–47 | 8–20 | | |
NYIT (Independent) (2014–2017)
| 2014 | NYIT | 4–46 | | | |
| 2015 | NYIT | 14–30 | | | |
| 2016 | NYIT | 17–26 | | | |
| 2017 | NYIT | 5–36–1 | | | |
| NYIT (D1 Independent): | | 40–138–1 | | | |
NYIT (East Coast Conference) (2018)
| 2018 | NYIT | 13–25–1 | 6–18 | 6th | |
| NYIT (ECC): | | | | | |
| Total: | | 63–210–2 | | | |
National champion Postseason invitational champion Conference regular season champion Conference regular season and conference tournament champion Division regular season champion Division regular season and conference tournament champion Conference tournament champion
