= Tony DiSpigna =

American type designer

Antonio "Tony" DiSpigna (born 1943) is an American type designer and graphic designer.

== Early life ==
DiSpigna was born in Forio d'Ischia, Italy. After emigrating to the United States with his family, he studied at the Pratt Institute, graduating in 1964.

== Career ==
DiSpigna worked alongside Herb Lubalin and Tom Carnase, and has worked independently from his New York studio, Artissimo, since 1973.

DiSpigna is known for his contribution to the design of several typefaces, most famously ITC Serif Gothic and ITC Lubalin Graph; but also many others. His typefaces have been used for corporations such as PBS and Coca-Cola.

DiSpigna is also known for his hand-drafted Spencerian lettering, a collection of which he published in his book Love Letters.

His career and design work are the subject of the Emmy-winning documentary film Imported from Brooklyn.

DiSpigna has taught at The School of Visual Arts and continues to teach at New York Institute of Technology and Pratt Institute. He is a professor of Graduate Communications Design.

== Awards ==
DiSpigna has won multiple awards for his designs. These include awards from The Art Directors Club, American Institute of Graphic Arts, The Type Directors Club, and The One Show. He also received the Pratt Institute Distinguished Teacher Award in 1999.
