= Biomedical Research, Innovation, and Imaging Center =

US research center

Coordinates: 40°48′35″N 73°36′23″W

The Biomedical Research, Innovation, and Imaging Center (BRIIC) is a $31 million 20,000-square-foot research center with collaborative laboratories and imaging equipment at the New York Institute of Technology that was opened on May 16, 2025.

== Construction ==
The Biomedical Research, Innovation, and Imaging Center (BRIIC) was constructed in the former 500 Building of the New York Institute of Technology on its Long Island campus. Alumni from the New York Institute of Technology's School of Architecture and Design and the College of Engineering and Computing Sciences, among others, represented some of the many professionals from several organizations that came together to build it. The building cost $31M.

== Building features and facilities ==
The research facility, named Biomedical Research, Innovation, and Imaging Center (BRIIC) houses, among others, open laboratory space with many lab benches, core labs, fume hoods, tissue culture rooms, labs for tissue engineering, a freezer room, an autoclave, a multicolor 3-D STED (stimulated emission depletion) microscope and a 2,000-square-foot functional magnetic resonance imaging (fMRI) suite dedicated solely for research purposes.
