= Bernard Fryshman =

Physics professor

Bernard Fryshman is a physics professor at the New York Institute of Technology since 1963 and the executive vice president of the Association of Advanced Rabbinical and Talmudic Schools since 1973.

He served two terms on the predecessor to the National Advisory Committee on Institutional Quality and Integrity, the body that advises U.S. Department of Education on issues related to higher education accreditation and institutional eligibility for federal student aid programs.

== Biography ==
Bernard Fryshman was born in Montreal, Quebec, Canada. He earned his Ph.D. in physics at the New York University.

He currently lives in Brooklyn, New York.
