= Frank LoVecchio =

American physician, medical toxicologist, academic and researcher

- Citizenship: American
- Occupations: Emergency medicine physician, medical toxicologist, academic, researcher, lecturer

Academic background
- Education: State University of New York at Stony Brook (BA); New York Institute of Technology College of Osteopathic Medicine (DO); Harvard School of Public Health (MPH)

Academic work
- Institutions: College of Health Solutions; Banner - University Medical Center Phoenix

Frank LoVecchio is an American emergency medicine physician, medical toxicologist, and clinical researcher. He is a professor at the University of Arizona and Creighton University School of Medicine, with academic appointments in emergency medicine, internal medicine, and pharmacology. His research focuses on emergency medicine, medical toxicology, infectious diseases, addiction medicine, and public health. He received the Arizona Public Health Association's Public Health Research Award in 2022 and the Phoenix Business Journal's Health Care Heroes Lifetime Achievement Award in 2025.

His research includes ketone levels in the lungs and blood, and pesticide exposures and scorpion stings in young children.

== Education ==
LoVecchio studied at State University of New York at Stony Brook and received his bachelor's degree in General Science in 1988. He earned his Doctor of Osteopathic Medicine degree from New York College of Osteopathic Medicine in 1992 and a Master of Public Health from Harvard School of Public Health in 2002. He then completed his internship at St. Barnabas Hospital, affiliated with Cornell Medical College and New York College of Osteopathic Medicine in 1993, his residency at Mount Sinai School of Medicine Integrated Residency in Emergency Medicine, Beth Israel Medical Center & City Hospital Center at Elmhurst in 1996, and his fellowship in Medical Toxicology at Good Samaritan Regional Medical Center in 1998. He is also board certified in Addiction Medicine and Medical Forensics.

== Career ==
LoVecchio has worked in emergency medicine since 1996. He served as vice chair and director of research in the Department of Emergency Medicine at Maricopa Integrated Health System, now Valleywise Health. His hospital appointments included Banner–University Medical Center, where he worked in emergency medicine, medical toxicology and critical care from 1998 to 2024, and Phoenix Children's Hospital, where he practised in pediatrics and intensive care until 2022. He also served as medical director or co-medical director of the Banner Poison and Drug Information Center for approximately two decades and as associate medical director of the Phoenix Fire Department from approximately 2000 to 2014.

Alongside his clinical work, LoVecchio has held academic appointments at the University of Arizona and Creighton University School of Medicine. He has been a professor at the University of Arizona since 2010, with appointments in emergency medicine, internal medicine and pharmacology, and at Creighton since 2017, in emergency medicine and internal medicine. He previously directed courses at Midwestern University's Arizona College of Osteopathic Medicine from 1996 to 2001. His teaching has included pharmacology, toxicology and emergency medicine for medical students and postgraduate trainees.

LoVecchio has also worked in laboratory medicine. He was medical toxicology laboratory director at Premier Lab Solutions in Phoenix from 2019 to 2021. His subsequent appointments include a laboratory directorship at Arizona State University's Biodesign Institute, beginning in 2024. He is board-certified in emergency medicine, medical toxicology, addiction medicine and medical forensics.

== Research ==
LoVecchio's research mainly focuses on ketone levels in the lungs and blood, and pesticide exposures and scorpion stings in young children. He has advocated in the legal arena regarding medical toxicology, emergency medicine, addiction, product safety and public health issues, and has also worked as an on-air expert on topics including, public health, opioid crisis, and COVID-19. He was featured in National Geographic’ Drugs, Inc. Flesh-Eating Krokodil episode.

=== COVID-19 pandemic ===
In a February 2021 New York Times documentary following Valleywise healthcare workers, LoVecchio gave positive remarks on the expected future COVID-19 situation in Arizona. In September of that year, he was part of a study that conducted a test-negative case-control investigation regarding the effectiveness of Moderna COVID-19 vaccine among U.S. health care personnel.

=== Emergency Medicine ===
In 2014, LoVecchio conducted a multicenter trial in the tertiary care setting, and found out that protocol-based resuscitation of patients in whom septic shock was diagnosed in the emergency department did not improve outcomes. In his paper published in 2010, he investigated the survival rate of patients with out-of-hospital cardiac arrest using compression-only CPR (COCPR) compared with conventional CPR. Results of his study showed that layperson compression-only CPR was associated with increased survival in comparison to conventional CPR and no bystander CPR in this setting with public endorsement of chest compression–only CPR.

LoVecchio also investigated the influence of the infecting pathogen on the hospital length of stay (LOS) for acute bronchiolitis. He determined that RSV was more frequently detected virus in children hospitalized with bronchiolitis, as compared to HRV; which was detected in one-quarter of the children.

In 1997, The dogma of avoiding analgesics in patients with acute abdominal pain was challenged, and in one of the first studies addressing this issue, LoVecchio and his colleagues, concluded that physical examination does change after the administration of analgesics in patients with acute abdominal pain. He also conducted a study to determine the impact of ED-initiated intervention in terms of subsequent suicidal behavior.

=== Medical Toxicology ===
LoVecchio published a paper in 2008 focused on how poison control centers decrease emergency healthcare utilization costs, and determined that the home management by Banner Poison Control Center provided large monetary savings to residents in comparison to dollars received in state support. He also focused his study on the centruroides sculpturatus and regarded it as the only scorpion native to the United States whose venom produces life‐threatening illness. He studied the distribution of the severity grades following scorpion envenomations, the time to deterioration, the onset of clinical signs and symptoms, and side effects regarding the antivenom treatment in children of particular age.

LoVecchio reviewed poison center data charts from January 2007 through December 2009, and discussed the outcomes of unintentional beta-blocker or calcium channel blocker overdoses among patients. Furthermore, he conducted a 5-year retrospective poison control center review and explored the outcomes regarding chlorine exposure in 598 patients.

== Recent research ==
In 2026, LoVecchio co-authored a study published in the Journal of Emergency Medicine examining racial and ethnic disparities in outcomes following implementation of the 2015 Severe Sepsis and Septic Shock Early Management Bundle (SEP-1). The study investigated whether differences in outcomes persisted across racial and ethnic groups following implementation of the early-management protocol.

His recent research has also addressed substance use and overdose prevention. In 2025, he co-authored a study published in the International Journal of Drug Policy examining perceptions of overdose risks among people who use illicit fentanyl-laced counterfeit pills. The research explored participants' understanding of overdose risks associated with different methods of consuming the pills.

LoVecchio was also a co-author of a 2025 study published in JAMA Network Open that examined presenteeism among health care personnel with symptomatic COVID-19. Using data collected from December 2020 through April 2024, the researchers investigated the frequency of employees continuing to work while ill and factors associated with that behavior.

In 2024, he co-authored a study in the Journal of Emergency Medicine evaluating a single-dose intravenous dalbavancin treatment pathway for acute bacterial skin and skin-structure infections. The article examined its potential implementation in emergency departments and the associated considerations for treatment delivery and costs.

LoVecchio has reported publishing more than 250 peer-reviewed articles and book chapters. His professional profile identifies research interests including drug development, drugs of abuse, COVID-19, infectious diseases, and environmental illness. In 2022, he was included in a database of the world's most-cited scientists based on standardized citation indicators.

== Awards and honors ==
- 2025: Lifetime Achievement Award, Phoenix Business Journal's Health Care Heroes awards.
- 2022: Public Health Research Award, Arizona Public Health Association.
- 2021: Finalist, Phoenix Business Journal's Health Care Heroes Lifetime Achievement Award.
- 2017: Best Educator award, associated with Maricopa Medical Center, the University of Arizona, and Creighton medical schools.
- 2017: Top Doctor in emergency medicine, Phoenix Magazine.
- 2015: Best Research Abstract, Academic Excellence Day, Phoenix.
- 2013: Arizona Physician Health Care Hero Award, Phoenix Business Journal.
- 2012: Banner Health Community Service and Paul L. Singer Award.
- 2011: Banner Health Community Service and Paul L. Singer Award.

== Selected bibliography ==
- ProCESS Investigators; Yealy, Donald M.; Kellum, John A.; Huang, David T.; Barnato, Amber E.; Weissfeld, Lisa A.; Pike, Francis; Terndrup, Thomas; Wang, Henry E.; Hou, Peter C.; LoVecchio, Frank; Filbin, Michael R.; Shapiro, Nathan I.; Angus, Derek C. (2014-05-01). "A randomized trial of protocol-based care for early septic shock". The New England Journal of Medicine. 370 (18): 1683–1693. doi:10.1056/NEJMoa1401602. ISSN 1533-4406. PMC 4101700. PMID 24635773.
- Bobrow, Bentley J.; Spaite, Daniel W.; Berg, Robert A.; Stolz, Uwe; Sanders, Arthur B.; Kern, Karl B.; Vadeboncoeur, Tyler F.; Clark, Lani L.; Gallagher, John V.; Stapczynski, J. Stephan; LoVecchio, Frank; Mullins, Terry J.; Humble, Will O.; Ewy, Gordon A. (2010-10-06). "Chest Compression–Only CPR by Lay Rescuers and Survival From Out-of-Hospital Cardiac Arrest". JAMA. 304 (13): 1447–1454. doi:10.1001/jama.2010.1392. ISSN 0098-7484. PMID 20924010.
- Huang, David T.; Yealy, Donald M.; Filbin, Michael R.; Brown, Aaron M.; Chang, Chung-Chou H.; Doi, Yohei; Donnino, Michael W.; Fine, Jonathan; Fine, Michael J.; Fischer, Michelle A.; Holst, John M.; Hou, Peter C.; Kellum, John A.; Khan, Feras; Kurz, Michael C. (2018-07-19). "Procalcitonin-Guided Use of Antibiotics for Lower Respiratory Tract Infection". New England Journal of Medicine. 379 (3): 236–249. doi:10.1056/NEJMoa1802670. ISSN 0028-4793. PMC 6197800. PMID 29781385.
- Talan, David A.; Mower, William R.; Krishnadasan, Anusha; Abrahamian, Fredrick M.; Lovecchio, Frank; Karras, David J.; Steele, Mark T.; Rothman, Richard E.; Hoagland, Rebecca; Moran, Gregory J. (2016-03-03). "Trimethoprim–Sulfamethoxazole versus Placebo for Uncomplicated Skin Abscess". New England Journal of Medicine. 374 (9): 823–832. doi:10.1056/nejmoa1507476. ISSN 0028-4793. PMC 4851110. PMID 26962903.
- Moran, Gregory J.; Abrahamian, Fredrick M.; Lovecchio, Frank; Talan, David A. (2013). "Acute bacterial skin infections: developments since the 2005 Infectious Diseases Society of America (IDSA) guidelines". The Journal of Emergency Medicine. 44 (6): e397–412. doi:10.1016/j.jemermed.2012.11.050. ISSN 0736-4679. PMID 23466022.
- Talan, David A.; Lovecchio, Frank; Abrahamian, Fredrick M.; Karras, David J.; Steele, Mark T.; Rothman, Richard E.; Krishnadasan, Anusha; Mower, William R.; Hoagland, Rebecca; Moran, Gregory J. (2016-06-15). "A Randomized Trial of Clindamycin Versus Trimethoprim-sulfamethoxazole for Uncomplicated Wound Infection". Clinical Infectious Diseases. 62 (12): 1505–1513. doi:10.1093/cid/ciw177. ISSN 1058-4838. PMC 4885652. PMID 27025829.

== See also ==
- COVID-19 pandemic
