= Frank Mruk =

American architect

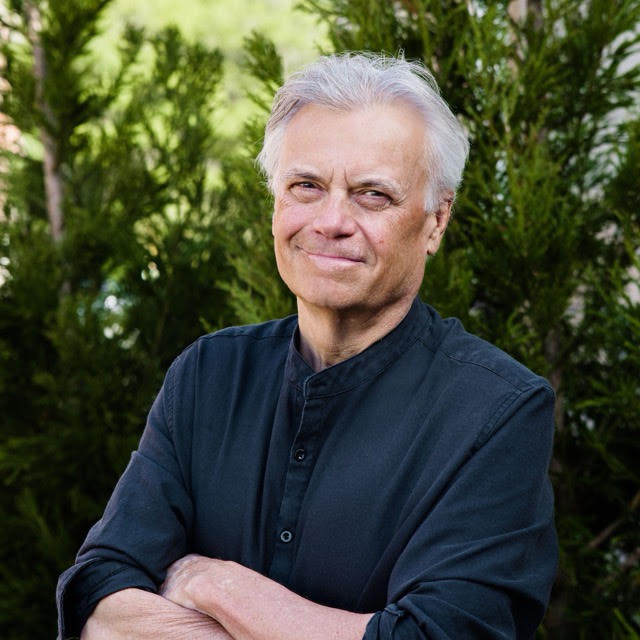
- Born: Buffalo, NY
- Education: Pratt Institute; University of Oxford; Pace University
- Occupation: Architect / Strategist
- Awards: Construction Specifications Institute Fellowship (2026); Morse Stone Fellowship (2023); American Institute of Architects Fellowship (2015); Strategic Planning Society Fellowship (2012)
- Practice: Emre Arolat Architects (2017–2019); NY-CSI (2012–present); DMA (2009–2012)

Frank Mruk is an architect and technology strategist. His research explores the nature of strategy in the creative pursuit of competitive advantage and innovation. He served as the executive director and founder of both the New York Center for Strategic Innovation and the Boston Center for Smart Building Technology.

== Education ==
He was educated at Pratt Institute, Pace University and at the University of Oxford. He has taught at the School of Visual Arts, the Rhode Island School of Design, Roger Williams University, the Parsons School of Design, New York University, and at the New York Institute of Technology where he served as associate dean for the School of Architecture and Design and has been a lecturer/visiting critic at the WE School, the United Nations, Oxford Brooks University, the University of Chile, the Fashion Institute of Technology, MIT, Columbia University, Harvard University and at Yale University. In 2021, Dean Mruk was ranked by Academic Influence in the top 1% in the world in influence in both the Architecture and Engineering professions.

Mruk studied with Lebbeus Woods and Raimund Abraham. He also worked for Cuban cinematographer Nestor Almendros during the filming of Heartburn with Meryl Streep and Jack Nicholson. He spent 10 years working on Wall Street for Maurice Greenberg at American International Group and later for John Mack at Morgan Stanley, and in professional practice for the Aga Khan (AKAA) winning architect Emre Arolat and earlier for William Breger, past dean of the New York School of Interior Design.

== Career ==
He has consulted for the Rhode Island Office of Innovation, Goldman Sachs, Apple Computer and has served as President of numerous professional organizations including: The Rhode Island American Institute of Architects, the Metro New York International Association for Strategy Professionals, the NY Construction Specifications Institute and the Northeast Region of the Construction Specifications Institute. Frank was elevated to Fellowship in both the Strategic Planning Society (UK) and the American Institute of Architects. He is a licensed Architect in the U.S., a Chartered Architect in the U.K. and has been a frequent lecturer on the topics of design, strategy and innovation. He co-authored two of the world's largest and most influential standards for Competitive Advantage and Strategic Management, the Association for Strategic Planning's Strategic Planning and Strategic Management Body of Knowledge and its Certification Exam Study Guide and the Institute for Management Accounting's Certified in Strategy and Competitive Analysis program.

Dean Mruk has been a vocal contributor to numerous efforts focused on the rethinking of suburbia, the profession and on issues of design practice. Mruk is also known for his efforts on transforming the built environment via competitions, sustainability and resiliency efforts, and international urban interventions, including representing the U.S. at two major interdesigns: Sweden's City Move in 2009 and Mumbai's Humanizing the Metropolis in 2014. In 2015–2016, he worked on the restoration of Le Corbusier's Villa Stein outside of Paris with Judith Dimaio and NYIT students, assisting Pierre Antoine Gaiter, Chief Architect for the Monuments of France. He has been an organizer, contributor and speaker at numerous events: TEDx, DESIGNxRI, TEDxNYIT, TEDxFallRiver, TEDxUCONN and the TED Global Oxford conference in 2009.

== Bibliography ==
- Co-Author, Association for Strategic Planning (ASP) Body of Knowledge 2.0 – Guide to the Strategic Planning and Strategic Management Body of Knowledge. 2015 Second Edition. Association for Strategic Planning.
- Contributor to Harriss, H., & Widder, L., Architecture live projects: Pedagogy into practice. 2014. Routledge. ISBN 978-0-4157-3352-6
- Co-Author, Association for Strategic Planning (ASP) Certification Exam Study Guide. 2011 Second Edition. Strategy Professional Resource Center. ISBN 978-0-6154-7493-9
