= Sheldon D. Fields =

American nurse and health policy analyst

- Born: Sheldon Darcy Fields; New York City, New York, US
- Education: Binghamton University (B.S. and M.S.) and University of Pennsylvania (Ph.D.)

Sheldon D. Fields is a Registered Professional Nurse, Family Nurse Practitioner, educator, researcher, health policy analyst, and nurse entrepreneur who is known for his work in the field of behavioral health research specializing in the area of HIV/AIDS prevention.

== Early life and education ==
Fields was born in Brooklyn, New York, the youngest child of six children raised by a single mother. Fields attended public schools and lived in Brooklyn until the age of 17. Sheldon attended Clara Barton High School for Health Professionals with the intention of going to medical school in the future. Instead, he discovered his love of nursing.

At the age of 17, Sheldon began his college education at the State University of New York (now known as Binghamton University). Fields graduated in 1991 and started his first job as a nurse at the Sloan Cancer Center in New York City. It was there that Fields first was exposed to the HIV/AIDS population. Working at Sloan Cancer Center, Fields also worked closely with Nurse Practitioners and decided to return to school to receive his advanced degree in nursing. In 1993, Fields returned to Binghamton University to complete a master's in family nursing with certification as Family Nurse Practitioner. While studying for his master's degree, Fields researched intimate partner violence. His mentor, Dr. Theresa Grabo, encouraged him to pursue a Ph.D., and Fields went on to attend the University of Pennsylvania, his mentor's alma mater, graduating with a Ph.D. in Nursing Science in 2000.

== Professional life ==
Fields's specialty is behavioral health, in particular HIV/AIDS prevention. He has produced contributions including scholarly articles, book chapters, seminars, webinars, newspaper articles, and television appearances. Many of his contributions focus on the young minority HIV/AIDS population.

Fields has conducted national-level research within the HIV Vaccine Trials Network (HVTN) and the HIV Prevention Trials Network(HPTN). Along with these endeavors, Fields began his career as an assistant professor at Binghamton University from 2000 to 2001. While in Rochester, New York, in 2009, he was selected for the highly competitive and prestigious Robert Wood Johnson Health Policy Fellowship, which allowed him to work in the office of United States Senator Barbara Mikulski (D-MD). Fields supported Senator Mikulski's work on the aging subcommittee of the Senate HELP committee during the height of the historic healthcare reform legislation. Shortly after, Fields was promoted to associate professor in the School of Nursing at the University of Rochester.

In late 2011, Fields became an associate professor at Florida International University's Nicole Wertheim College of Nursing and Health Sciences and was the first assistant dean of clinical affairs and health policy, as well as the co-director of the Doctor of Nursing Practice (DNP) program. Fields left Florida in January 2015 to be the dean of the Mervyn M. Dymally School of Nursing at Charles R. Drew University of Medicine and Science in Los Angeles, California. This appointment made Fields one of the youngest nursing deans in the country. Fields is also one of very few people of color (Afro-Latino) or men to have led a school of nursing. Fields left Drew in 2016, and in January 2017 he began work as dean of New York Institute of Technology's School of Health Professions, where he oversaw five allied health degree programs. until August 2019. He is founder and CEO of his own healthcare consultant firm that he started in 2016.

Fields has been cited in several newspapers, including the Sun-Sentinel and the Bay Area Reporter. He has also written a chapter in the book Disaster Nursing and Emergency Preparedness.

== Awards and honors ==
- Gerald A. Ludd Lifetime Award for Excellence in Support of HIV/AIDS and Community Service—NAESM, Inc
- American Leaders Under 40 (Selected one of by the Democrat and Chronicle Newspaper)
- Outstanding Scholarly Practitioner Award—URSON
- Association of Nurses in AIDS Care President's Award
- Heart of MOCHA Stewardship Award
- Paul “Pat” Burduck Award—Strong Health for exemplary care for patients with AIDS
- Promising New Investigator Award-University of Rochester School of Nursing
- Helen Maremontes Advocacy Award - Association of Nurses in AIDS Care
- Trailblazer Award - National Black Nurses Association (2017)

== Works ==
=== Journal articles ===
- Koblin BA, Mayer KH, Eshleman SH, Wang L, Mannheimer S, et al. (2013) Correlates of HIV Acquisition in a Cohort of Black Men Who Have Sex with Men in the United States: HIV Prevention Trials Network (HPTN) 061. PLoS ONE 8(7): e70413. doi:10.1371/journal.pone.0070413
- Phillips, II, G., Hightow-Weidman, L. B., Arya, M., Fields, S. D., Halpern-Felsher, B., Outlaw, A. Y., Wohl, A.R., & Hidalgo, J. (2012). HIV Testing Behaviors of a Cohort of HIV-Positive Racial/Ethnic Minority YMSM. AIDS and Behavior (Published on line May 4, 2012). DOI 10.1007/s10461-012-0193-2
- Hidalgo, J., Coombs, E., Cobbs, W. O., Green-Jones, M., Phillips II, G., Wohl, A. R., Smith, J. C., Ramos, A. D., & Fields, S. D., for The Young MSM of Color SPNS Initiative Study Group. (2011). Roles and Challenges of Outreach Workers in HIV Clinical and Support Programs Serving Young Racial/Ethnic Minority Men Who Have Sex with Men. AIDSPatient Careand STDs, 25(S1): S15-S22.
- Outlaw, A. Y., Phillips II, G., Hightow-Weidman, L. B., Fields, S. D., Hidalgo, J., Halpern-Felsher, B., Green- Jones, M., & and The Young MSM of Color SPNS Initiative Study Group. (2011). Age of MSM Sexual Debut and Risk Factors: Results from a Multisite Study of Racial/Ethnic Minority YMSM Living with HIV. AIDSPatient Care and STDs, 25(S1): S23-S29.
- Hightow-Weidman, L. B., Phillips II, G., Jones, K. C., Outlaw, A. Y., Fields, S. D., & Smith, J. C., for the YMSM of Color SPNS Initiative Study Group. (2011). Racial and Sexual Identity-Related Maltreatment Among Minority YMSM: Prevalence, Perceptions, and the Association with Emotional Distress. AIDS Patient Care and STDs, 25(S1): S39-S45.
- Phillips II, G., Outlaw, A. Y., Hightow-Weidman, L. B., Jones, K. C., Wohl, A. R., Futterman, D., Skinner, J. A., Fields, S. D., & Hidalgo, J., for the YMSM of Color SPNS Initiative Study Group. (2011). Sexual Behaviors of Racial/Ethnic Minority Young Men Who Have Sex with Men. AIDSPatient Careand STDs, 25(S1): S47-S53.
- Magnus, M., Jone, K., Phillips, G., Binson, D., Hightow-Weidman, L. B., Richards-Clarke, C., Wohl, A. R., Outlaw, A., Giordano, T. P., Quamina, A., Cobbs, W., Fields, S. D., Tinsley, M., Cajina, A., & Hildago, J. (2010). Characteristics Associated with Retention among African American and Latino Adolescent HIV Positive Men: Results from the Outreach, Care, and Prevention to Engage HIV Seropositive Young MSM of Color Special Project of National Significance Initiative. Journal of Acquired Immune Deficiency Syndromes, 53 (4), 529–536.
- Fields, S. D., Malebranch, D., & Feist-Price, S. (2008). Childhood Sexual Abuse in Black Men who have Sex with Men: Results from three Qualitative Studies. Cultural Diversity & Ethnic Minority Psychology, 14 (4), 385–390.
- Fields, S. D., Wharton, M. J., Marrero, A., Little, A., Pannell, K., & Morgan, J. (2006). Internet Chat rooms: Connecting with a New Generation of Young Men of Color at Risk for HIV Infection who have Sex with Men. Journal of the Association of Nurses in AIDSCare, 17(6), 53–60.
