= Roberto FE Soto =

Cuban-American journalist and television producer

Roberto FE Soto is a Cuban-American journalist and media executive. He is known for his work in English- and Spanish-language transmissions during the 1980s and beyond.

== Career ==
In the 1980s, Soto worked as a producer for NBC News. He was a member of the production team for NBC News Overnight, which received the Alfred I. duPont–Columbia University Award from the Columbia University Graduate School of Journalism.

When Associated Press Television News acquired competitor Worldwide Television News in 1999, Soto was hired as the organization's first New York City Bureau Chief, overseeing the redesign of the New York newsroom at the former WTN facilities at 1995 Broadway.

Soto contributed to the establishment of USIA-TV Martí, the U.S. government television service that began broadcasting to Cuba on March 27, 1990, under the administration of President George H. W. Bush.

== Awards ==
In 1985, Soto and his colleagues at NBC News Overnight received the Alfred I. duPont–Columbia University Award, administered by the Columbia University Graduate School of Journalism.
