= The Journal of Emergency Medicine =

- Discipline: Emergency medicine
- Language: English
- Edited by: Stephen Hayden

Publication details
- History: 1983-present
- Publisher: Elsevier
- Frequency: Monthly
- Open access: Hybrid
- Impact factor: 1.175 (2013)

Standard abbreviations
- ISO 4: J. Emerg. Med.

Indexing
- ISSN: 0736-4679
- OCLC no.: 09159685

Links
- Journal homepage; Online access; Online archive; Journal page on publisher's website

The Journal of Emergency Medicine is a monthly peer-reviewed medical journal covering emergency medicine. It is the official journal of the American Academy of Emergency Medicine. The editor-in-chief is Stephen Hayden (University of California, San Diego). The founding editor was Peter Rosen and it is published by Elsevier. It was established in 1983 and originally published by Pergamon Press. The journal is often referred to by its acronym, JEM.

== Abstracting and indexing ==
The journal is abstracted and indexed in:

- Academic OneFile
- BIOSIS Previews
- CAB Abstracts
- Cambridge Scientific Abstracts
- CINAHL
- Current Contents/Clinical Medicine
- Elsevier BIOBASE
- Embase
- Emergency Medical Abstracts
- Global Health
- Hospital Medicine
- Index Medicus/PubMed/MEDLINE
- International Bibliography of Book Reviews
- International Bibliography of Periodical Literature
- Science Citation Index Expanded
- Scopus
- Tropical Diseases Bulletin

According to the Journal Citation Reports, the journal has a 2013 impact factor of 1.175, ranking it 12th out of 25 journals in the category "Emergency Medicine".
