= Harriet Harriss =

British architect and educator

Dr. Harriet Harriss
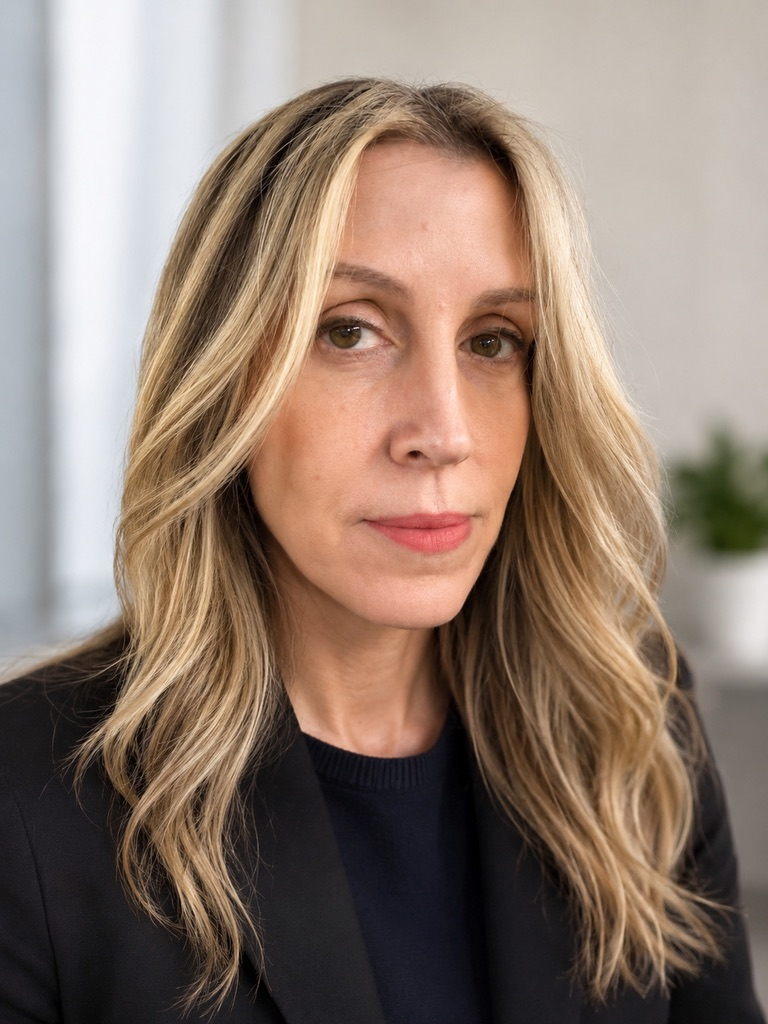
- Harriss in 2026
- Education: University of Manchester (BA); Royal College of Art (MA); Architectural Association (PGDip); Kingston University (Part III); Oxford Brookes University (PhD)
- Occupations: Architect, academic, author
- Employer: Pratt Institute
- Known for: Architectural education, feminist architecture, architectural pedagogy, climate justice
- Awards: Bates Smart Media Award (2021); Principal Fellowship of the Higher Education Academy

Dr. Harriet Harriss (born 1973) is a British architect, educator, author, and professor of Architecture at Pratt Institute, New York and a visiting professor at the Graduate School of Architecture at the University of Johannesburg, South Africa. She is also an INELDA-certified death doula. Her research and practice examine the changing role of architecture in society, bringing together architectural education, feminist theory, decolonial theory, environmental humanities, and professional practice to explore how architecture can respond to the intertwined challenges of climate change, social inequality, and ecological loss.

Across more than two decades, Harriss has developed an internationally recognised body of scholarship questioning who architecture serves, who gets to shape its histories, and how architectural education might better prepare practitioners for rapidly changing environmental and cultural conditions. Her work argues for an expanded understanding of architecture—not simply as the design of buildings, but as a social, political, ecological, and ethical practice capable of producing new forms of care, participation, and public imagination.

Her early research transformed debates around architectural pedagogy through the development of "live projects" and experiential learning, culminating in Architecture Live Projects: Pedagogy into Practice (Routledge, 2014), now widely regarded as a foundational contribution to socially engaged architectural education. She subsequently extended this work through publications including Radical Pedagogies (2015) and The Routledge Companion to Architectural Pedagogies of the Global South (2022), advocating more inclusive, interdisciplinary, and globally representative models of design education.

A second strand of Harriss's scholarship examines the future of architectural work itself. Through Architects After Architecture (2020) and the Erasmus+-funded Architecture's Afterlife project, she has challenged conventional definitions of professional success by demonstrating the broad societal value of architectural education beyond traditional architectural practice. This research has become influential in debates concerning graduate employability, professional identity, curriculum reform, and the future of the architectural profession.

Running throughout her work is a sustained commitment to feminist and decolonial architectural history. Her books A Gendered Profession (2016), Greta Magnusson Grossman: Modern Design from Sweden to California (2021), and 100 Women: Architects in Practice (2024) seek to expand architecture's historical canon by recovering overlooked practitioners and challenging inherited definitions of architectural authorship, expertise, and excellence.

More recently, Harriss's research has turned towards architecture's ethical relationship with the living world. Drawing upon posthumanism, environmental humanities, and critical heritage studies, she investigates how architecture participates in processes of extinction, grief, care, and ecological transformation. This work encompasses scholarship on environmental ethics, climate justice, multispecies futures, and the cultural implications of biodiversity loss, while also informing public projects including the interdisciplinary performance work Right to Flight and the forthcoming editorial volume An Incomplete Atlas of Death and Dying Architectures.

Alongside her research, Harriss has held senior academic leadership roles including dean of the Pratt Institute School of Architecture (2019–2022), head of the Postgraduate Research Programme in Architecture at the Royal College of Art, and head of the Master's programme in Applied Design in Architecture at Oxford Brookes University. She has served on numerous international advisory boards, accreditation panels, and award juries, and regularly contributes to public debate through books, exhibitions, broadcasts, and essays in publications including Dezeen, e-flux Architecture, Architects' Journal, and Architecture and Culture.

Her work has received international recognition through awards including the Australian Institute of Architects' Bates Smart Award for Architecture in the Media, the Principal Fellowship of Advance HE (formerly the Higher Education Academy), the Clore Leadership Fellowship, and the Winston Churchill Memorial Fellowship. Across scholarship, teaching, public engagement, and institutional leadership, Harriss's work consistently argues for a more equitable, ecologically literate, and socially engaged architecture.

== Career ==
=== Architectural education ===
Harriss began teaching architecture in the United Kingdom during the 2000s before joining Oxford Brookes University, where she became Head of the Master's programme in Applied Design in Architecture. In 2015 Harriss joined the Royal College of Art as Head of the Postgraduate Research Programme in Architecture, later becoming Reader in Architectural Education. Her work focused on doctoral education, interdisciplinary research and the changing role of architecture in response to environmental and social challenges. In 2019 Harriss was appointed dean of the Pratt Institute School of Architecture. During her deanship she oversaw the school through the COVID-19 pandemic and initiated a number of public programmes, research initiatives and projects examining equity, climate justice and architectural education. Following her deanship, Harriss returned to the faculty as professor of Architecture, where her teaching and research have centred on historic preservation, architectural ethics, environmental humanities and the future of design education.

=== Public engagement ===
Alongside her academic work, Harriss has written extensively for architectural publications and has appeared as a commentator on architecture and design for broadcast media including the BBC and Monocle Radio.

She has served on advisory boards, professional juries and research panels for organisations including the American Institute of Architects New York, the Design Museum Future Observatory and the Royal Institute of British Architects.

=== Academic leadership ===
Throughout her career, Harriss has contributed to international architectural education through accreditation, external examining, doctoral supervision and curriculum development. She has served as an external examiner and adviser to universities and accreditation bodies in Europe, the Middle East and Africa.

She has also acted as a judge for international architecture and design awards including the Dezeen Awards and the Architects' Journal Awards. Harriss is recognized as an advocate for diversity and inclusion within design education, and was nominated by Dezeen as a champion for women in architecture and design in 2019.

== Research ==
Harriss's research examines the relationship between architecture, education, professional practice, and social and environmental justice. Her scholarship has combined architectural history, critical pedagogy, feminist theory, environmental humanities, and professional studies to explore how architecture is taught, practised, and understood within broader cultural and ecological contexts.

=== Architectural education and pedagogy ===
Harriss first became known for research into architectural education, particularly the role of experiential learning and "live projects" in design pedagogy. Her doctoral research at Oxford Brookes University examined methods for assessing live projects in architectural education, contributing to wider debates on socially engaged learning and the relationship between universities, communities, and professional practice.

This work culminated in Architecture Live Projects: Pedagogy into Practice (2014), co-authored with Lynnette Widder, followed by Radical Pedagogies (2015) and Architectural Pedagogies of the Global South (2022). Across these publications, Harriss has argued for more inclusive, interdisciplinary, and socially responsive models of architectural education, challenging Eurocentric assumptions embedded within traditional curricula. Her work with Royal College of Art students on the Refugee Wearable Project was featured across multiple global media channels.

=== Professional practice and architectural labour ===
A second strand of Harriss's research concerns the changing nature of architectural work and professional identity. Rather than treating architectural practice solely as the production of buildings, her research has examined the diverse careers pursued by architecture graduates and the transferable knowledge produced through architectural education.

She edited Architects After Architecture (2020), which explored alternative career pathways for architects working beyond conventional professional practice. This research was subsequently extended through the Erasmus+-funded international project Architecture's Afterlife, culminating in the publication of Architecture's Afterlife: The Multisector Impact of an Architecture Degree (2024). The project examined the migration of architecture graduates into sectors including government, technology, education, publishing, and public policy, arguing that architectural education produces forms of expertise extending well beyond the building profession.

=== Feminist and de-colonial architectural history ===
Harriss's scholarship has also focused on expanding the historical canon of architecture through feminist and decolonial perspectives. Her publications have examined the historical exclusion of women from architectural histories and institutions while advocating broader definitions of architectural practice and authorship.

Her books A Gendered Profession (2016), Greta Magnusson Grossman: Modern Design from Sweden to California (2021), and 100 Women: Architects in Practice (2024) contribute to this body of work by documenting overlooked practitioners and reconsidering the criteria through which architectural significance has traditionally been evaluated.

Alongside her publications, Harriss has developed research initiatives including Mistresses of Architecture, an archival project examining the contribution of women to architectural education and practice.

Architecture, ecology, and environmental ethics

Since the early 2020s Harriss's research has increasingly addressed the ethical implications of climate collapse, biodiversity loss, extinction, and environmental justice. Drawing upon environmental humanities and posthumanist theory, her work explores architecture as an ecological actor rather than solely a cultural or technical discipline.

She co-edited Working at the Intersection: Architecture After the Anthropocene (2022), examining architecture's relationship with climate justice, decolonisation, and ecological transformation. Subsequent essays, including "Solastalgic Architecture" (2026), have explored environmental grief, landscape change, and architectural responses to planetary instability.

Across these research themes, Harriss has consistently argued for an expanded understanding of architecture that encompasses education, ethics, public engagement, ecological responsibility, and the wider social consequences of design.

== Selected published works ==
Harriss has authored and edited books on architectural education, feminist architectural history, professional practice, and the environmental humanities. Her publications have examined the changing role of architectural education, alternative models of professional practice, gender and representation in architecture, and architecture's relationship to climate change and ecological ethics.

- Architecture Live Projects: Pedagogy into Practice (with Lynnette Widder). Routledge, 2014.
- Radical Pedagogies: Architectural Education and the British Tradition (co-edited with Daisy Froud). RIBA Publishing, 2015.
- A Gendered Profession: The Question of Representation in Space Making (co-edited with Jane Brown, Ruth Morrow and James Soane). RIBA Publishing, 2016.
- Interior Futures (co-edited with Graeme Brooker and Kellie Walker). Crucible Press, 2019.
- Architects After Architecture: Alternative Pathways for Practice (co-edited with Rory Hyde and Roberta Marcaccio). Routledge, 2020.
- Greta Magnusson Grossman: Modern Design from Sweden to California (with Naomi House). Lund Humphries, 2021.
- Working at the Intersection: Architecture After the Anthropocene (co-edited with Naomi House). RIBA Publishing, 2022.
- The Routledge Companion to Architectural Pedagogies of the Global South (co-edited with Ashraf Salama and Ane González Lara). Routledge, 2022.
- 100 Women: Architects in Practice (co-edited with Naomi House, Monika Parrinder and Tom Ravenscroft). RIBA Publishing, 2024.
- Architecture's Afterlife: The Multisector Impact of an Architecture Degree. Routledge, 2024.

=== Chapters and essays ===
Harriss has contributed chapters to edited collections on architectural history, pedagogy, gender, and environmental humanities. These include essays in The Routledge Companion to Women in Architecture (2021), Extinct: A Compendium of Obsolete Objects (2021), The Routledge Companion to Architecture and Social Engagement (2018), and All-Inclusive Engagement in Architecture (2020).

She has written essays and commentary for Architects' Journal, Architecture and Culture, e-flux, Dezeen, Espazium, and other architectural journals and magazines.

== Awards and recognition ==
Harriss has received awards and fellowships recognising her contributions to architectural education, design research, cultural leadership, and public engagement. Among her principal distinctions are:

- Principal Fellow of the Higher Education Academy (PFHEA) (2018), awarded in recognition of sustained leadership and impact in higher education
- Clore Leadership Fellowship (2016–17), awarded by the Clore Leadership Programme for cultural leadership
- Australian Institute of Architects Bates Smart Award for Architecture in the Media (2021), awarded to Architects After Architecture
- Aurora Women in Leadership Programme (Advance HE) (2019)
- Winston Churchill Memorial Fellowship (2011), supporting international research in architectural education
- Higher Education Academy Internationalisation Fellowship (2011)
- Daiwa Foundation Fellowship (2004)

Harriss has also held competitive research and creative residencies, including the Arctic Circle Residency (2024), the Institute for Public Architecture Writer's Residency (2024), the Kingsland Wildflowers Public Arts Residency (2026), and the Pratt Center for Community Development Taconic Fellowship (2025–26).

In 2026, she was among the winning entrants in the Museum of Architecture's After the Palace design competition.

Harriss has also served on international award juries, including the RIBA President's Medals, the Dezeen Awards, the Architects' Journal Awards, and the World of Interiors Awards, reflecting her standing within architectural education and the profession.
