= New York Institute of Technology =

Private university in New York

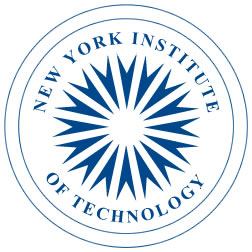
- Motto: Mens et Manus (Latin)
- Motto in English: "Mind and Hand"
- Type: Private research university
- Established: 1955; 71 years ago
- Founder: Alexander Schure
- Accreditation: MSCHE
- Academic affiliations: AITU; NAICU
- Endowment: $130.3 million (2023)
- Budget: $269.5 million (2023)
- President: Jerry Balentine
- Provost: Francine Glazer (interim)
- Academic staff: 389 full-time; 556 part-time (2018)
- Administrative staff: 754 full-time; 101 part-time (2018)
- Students: 8,054 (spring 2024)
- Undergraduates: 3,419 (fall 2023)
- Postgraduates: 4,252 (fall 2023)
- Other students: 40 (extended education)
- Location: Old Westbury, New York, United States; 40°46′11″N 73°58′57″W
- Campus: Large Suburb, 1,050 acres (4.2 km^{2}) (Old Westbury campus) Large City, 25 acres (0.10 km^{2}) (Manhattan campus)
- Newspaper: The Campus Slate
- Other campuses: Central Islip; New York City; Jonesboro; Beijing; Nanchang; Nanjing; Shanghai; Shenzhen; Vancouver
- Colors: Blue; Gold
- Nickname: Bears
- Sporting affiliations: NCAA Division II – East Coast
- Mascot: Roary the Bear
- Website: nyit.edu

The New York Institute of Technology (NYIT or New York Tech) is a private research university with two main campuses in New York, one in Old Westbury, on Long Island, and one on the Upper West Side in Manhattan. The university was founded in 1955. In addition to its main campuses, it has a cybersecurity research lab, a biosciences and bioengineering lab, Nassau County's first Class 10,000 clean room for nanoengineering, and the Entrepreneurship and Technology Innovation Center, which has close links to NASA, in Old Westbury, as well as campuses in Arkansas, China, and Canada. The U.S. Department of Defense and the U.S. Department of Homeland Security designated NYIT as a National Center of Academic Excellence in Cyber Defense Education.

NYIT has over 100 undergraduate and graduate degree programs. It awards bachelor's, master's and doctoral degrees for the completion of these programs. It has five schools and two colleges, all with an emphasis on technology and applied scientific research. NYIT's 2025 Carnegie Classification has been designated as a Mixed Undergraduate/Graduate-Doctorate Medium.

The New York Institute of Technology Computer Graphics Lab has played an important role in the history of computer graphics and animation, as founders of Pixar and Lucasfilm, including Turing Award winners Edwin Catmull and Patrick Hanrahan, began their research there. NYIT is the birthplace of entirely 3D CGI films.

New York Tech enrolled 7,711 full-time students across its campuses worldwide in 2023. NYIT's intercollegiate competitive sports teams, include its four-time NCAA Division II national champion lacrosse team. All of NYIT's teams compete in Division II. The NYIT Bears are part of the East Coast Conference.

New York Tech's alumni and faculty include academic scholars, literary and media figures, National Academies members, inventors, government officials, international royalty, professional athletes, Olympians, billionaires, founders and chief executives of Fortune 500 companies, and recipients of Turing Awards, Emmy Awards, and Academy Awards.

== History ==
=== Foundation and vision ===
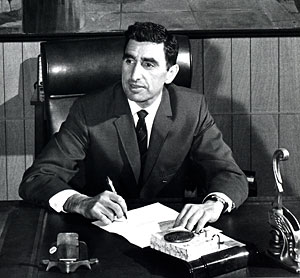
NYIT's first president, Alexander Schure

In 1910, the New York Institute of Technology's predecessor, New York Technical Institute, opened. In 1955, the New York Institute of Technology opened under a provisional charter granted by the New York State Board of Regents to NYIT. Its first campus opened at 500 Pacific Street in Brooklyn, New York. The founders of NYIT, and in particular, Alexander Schure, started NYIT based on the European polytechnic university model, with the mission of offering career-oriented professional education, providing all qualified students access to opportunity, and supporting applications-oriented research. Schure later served as NYIT's first president. In the higher education community at the time, a debate arose around the concern that humanities studies would be overshadowed by too much emphasis on science and engineering. NYIT's goal was to create a balance between science/engineering and a liberal arts education, and ever since, it has been focusing on this model to prepare students for current and future careers.

By the 1958–1959 academic year, the university had 300 students, and the time had come to expand its physical operations. In April 1958, the college purchased the Pythian Temple at 135–145 W. 70th St. in Manhattan for its main center. The building, adjacent to the planned Lincoln Center for the Performing Arts, was an ornate 12-story structure with a columned entranceway. Built in 1929 at a cost of $2 million, it included among its features a 1,200-seat auditorium. In 1958, NYIT sponsored the first National Technology Awards, created by Frederick Pittera, an organizer of international fairs and a member of the NYIT Board of Trustees, to help raise funds for the NYIT science and technology laboratories. The awards, held at the Waldorf-Astoria Hotel, were attended by several hundred guests, with entertainment provided by the U.S. Air Force Band. Senate Majority Leader and future President of the United States Lyndon Johnson was the keynote speaker. His speech was broadcast nationally by the ABC Radio Network. Among the honorees were Dr. Wernher von Braun and Major General Bernard Schriever, Commanding General of the Ballistic Air Command. Photos, press clippings, and audio tapes of the event are on view at the Lyndon Johnson Library at Austin, Texas.

=== Distinction through technology ===
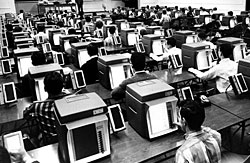
NYIT pioneered computers in the classrooms, it was the first to introduce “teaching machines” in the 1950s

==== Teaching Machines ====
In 1959, NYIT introduced “teaching machines” for student instruction in physics, electronics, and mathematics. NYIT also pioneered the use of mainframes as a teaching tool, having received its first, donated by the CIT Financial Corporation, in 1965. The curriculum was successful enough that NYIT received two grants totaling approximately $3 million from the federal government – one to develop a system of individualized learning through the use of computers; the other to develop a computer-based course in general physics for midshipmen at the United States Naval Academy in Annapolis, Md. WLIW (TV) got studio space when it moved in to the New York Institute of Technology in Westbury in 1974, but that arrangement lasted two years.

==== NYIT Computer Graphics Lab ====
In 1974, the New York Institute of Technology Computer Graphics Lab was established and attracted the likes of: Pixar Animation Studios president Edwin Catmull and co-founder Alvy Ray Smith; Walt Disney Feature Animation Chief Scientist Lance Williams; DreamWorks animator Hank Grebe; and Netscape and Silicon Graphics founder James H. Clark. Researchers at the New York Institute of Technology Computer Graphics Lab created the tools that made entirely 3D CGI films possible. NYIT CG Lab was regarded as the top computer animation research and development group in the world during the late 70s and early 80s.

==== Clean Air Road Rally ====
In 1995, the NYIT School of Engineering took first place in the U.S. Department of Energy's Clean Air Road Rally. The student engineering team spent three years designing and building the high-performance hybrid electric car that beat 43 other vehicles. In 1998, NYIT opened its first international program in China. In 1999, Bill Gates spoke at NYIT and received NYIT's Presidential Medal. In 2002, NYIT installed the fastest broadband network on the East Coast.

=== The 21st century ===
In 2003, NYIT opened its Bahrain site to students seeking an American-style education in the Middle East.

In 2018, NYIT and Holon Institute of Technology, a university based in Israel, signed a memorandum of understanding to pursue research opportunities for faculty and students at both universities.

== Campuses ==
External videos
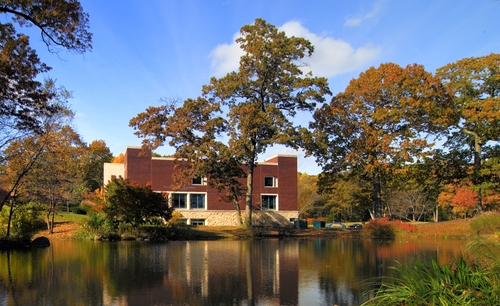
- Virtual tour of NYIT's scenic 1,050-acre Old Westbury campus., 21 December 2009, 7:01

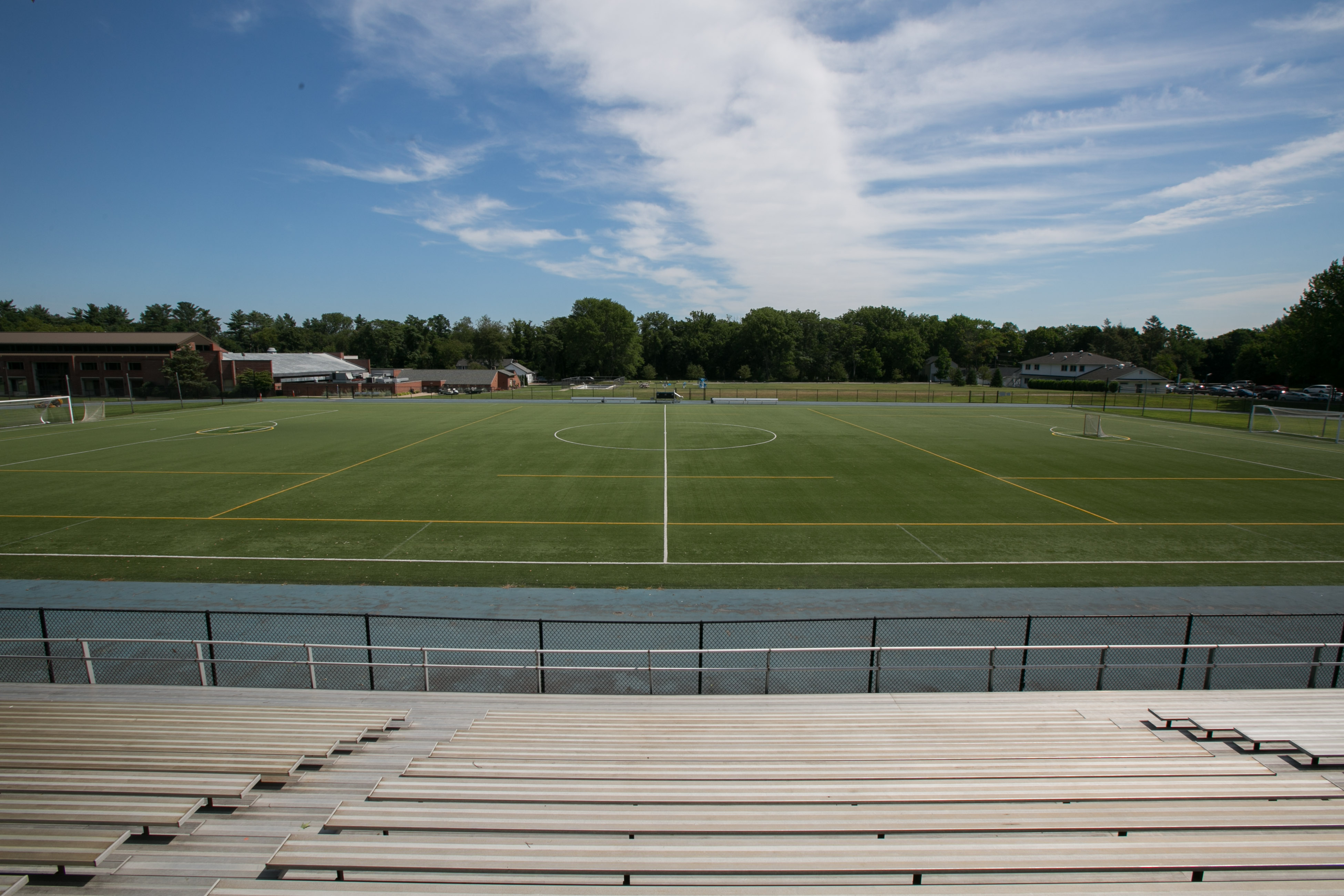
Old Westbury campus President's Stadium, home of the men's and women's soccer teams and the men's lacrosse team.

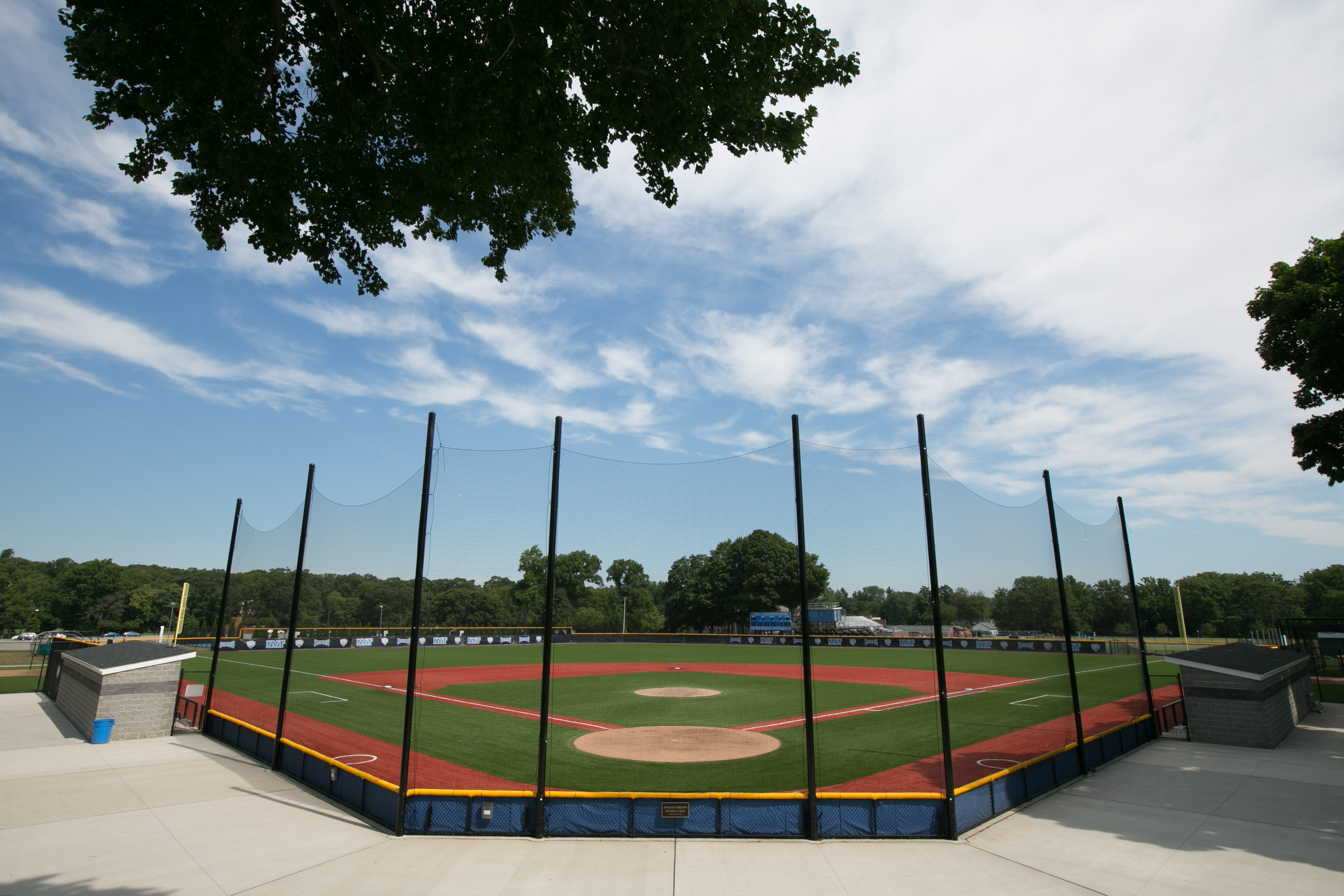
Old Westbury campus baseball field

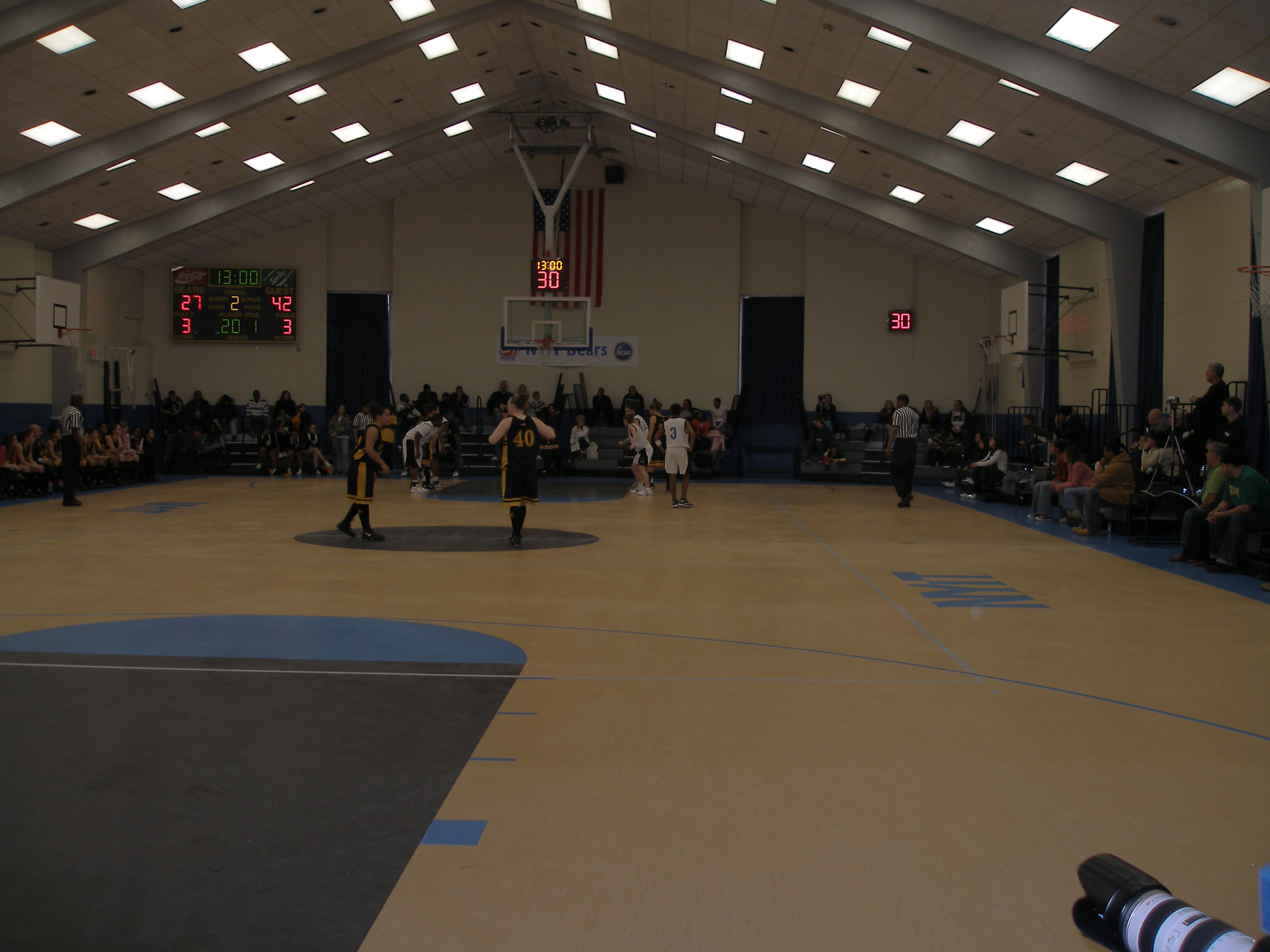
Old Westbury campus Recreation Hall during an NYIT Bears women's basketball game

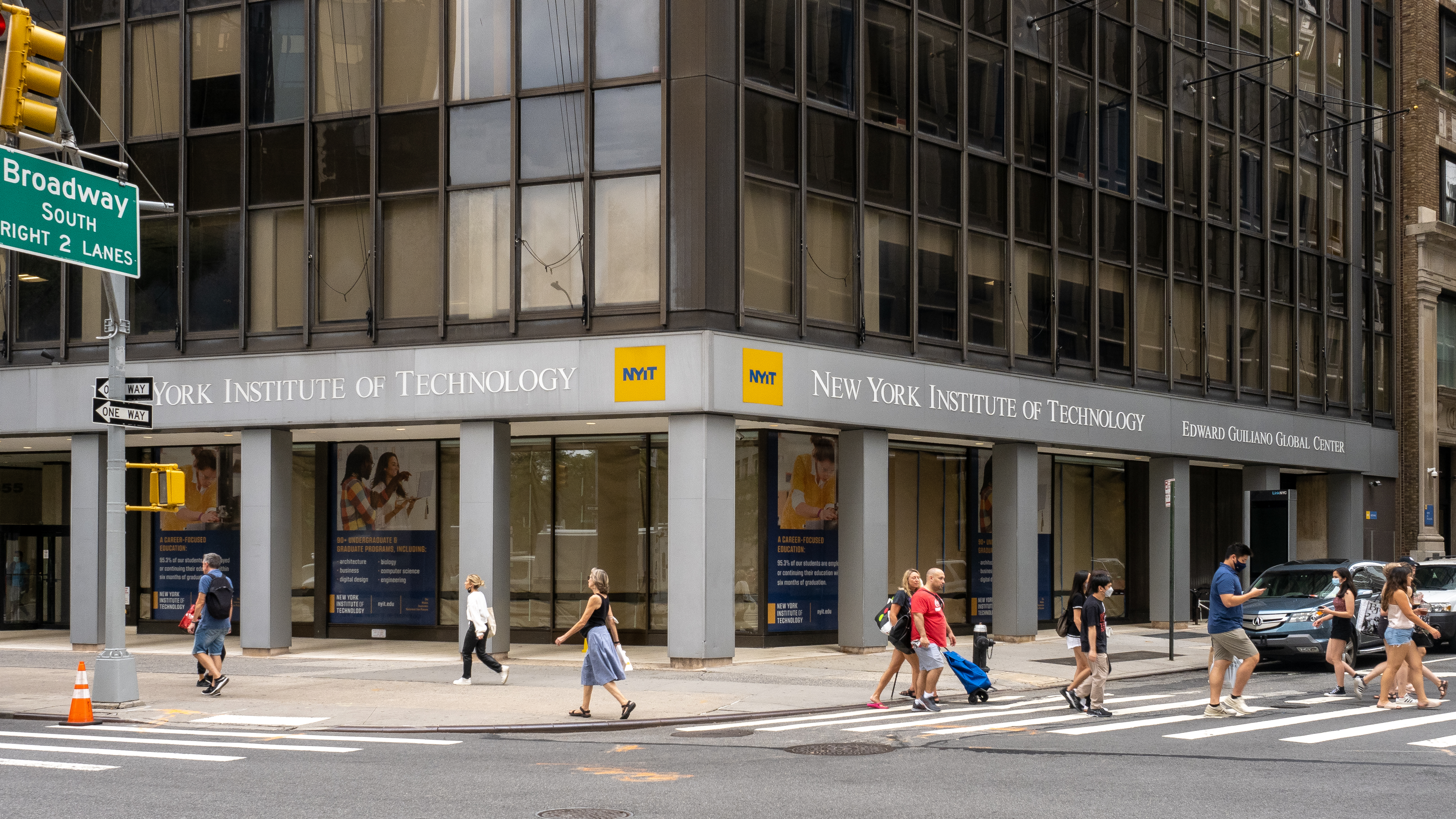
Edward Guiliano Global Center, 1855 Broadway, Manhattan

=== Old Westbury ===
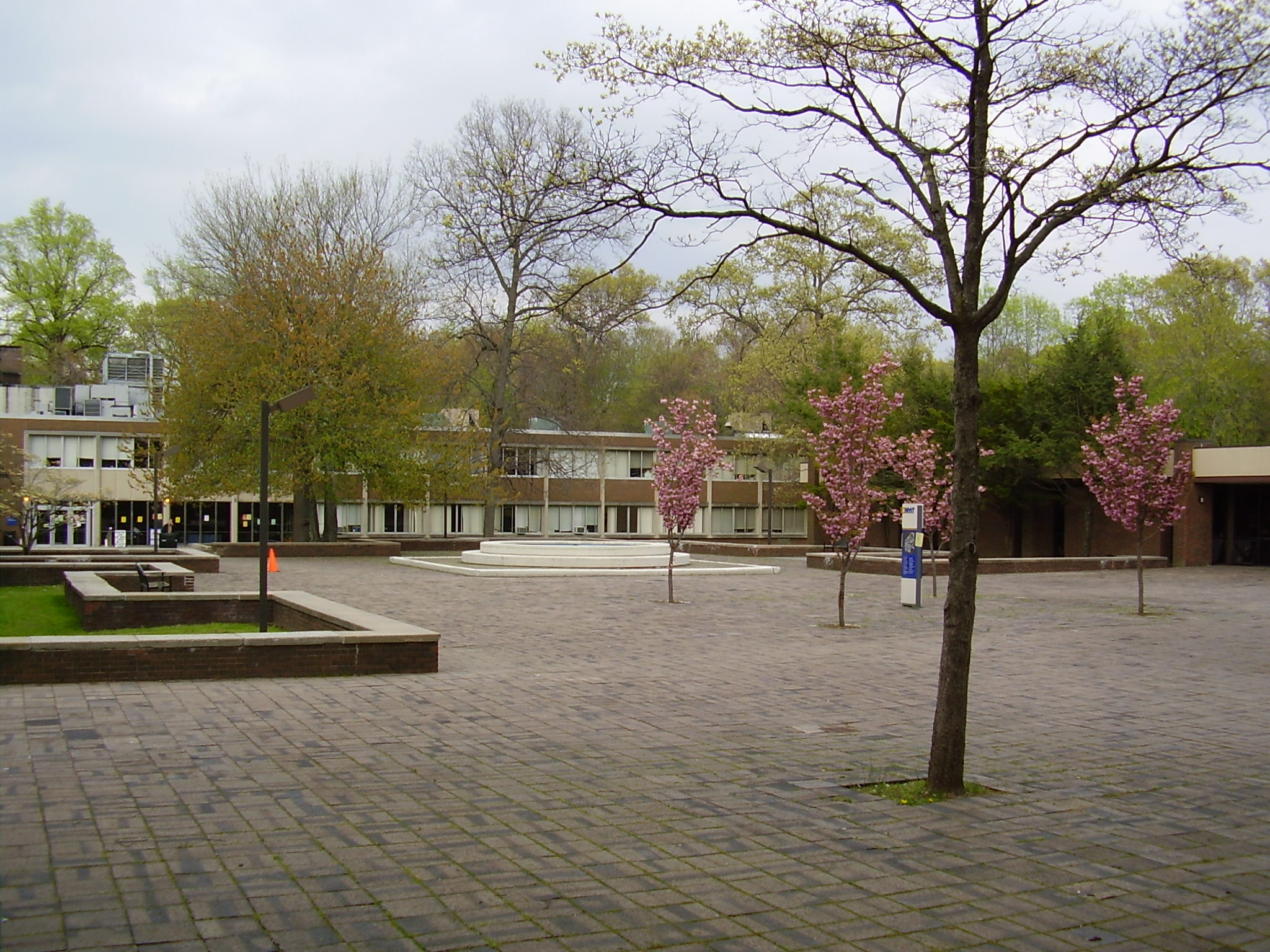
Academic Quad, Old Westbury campus

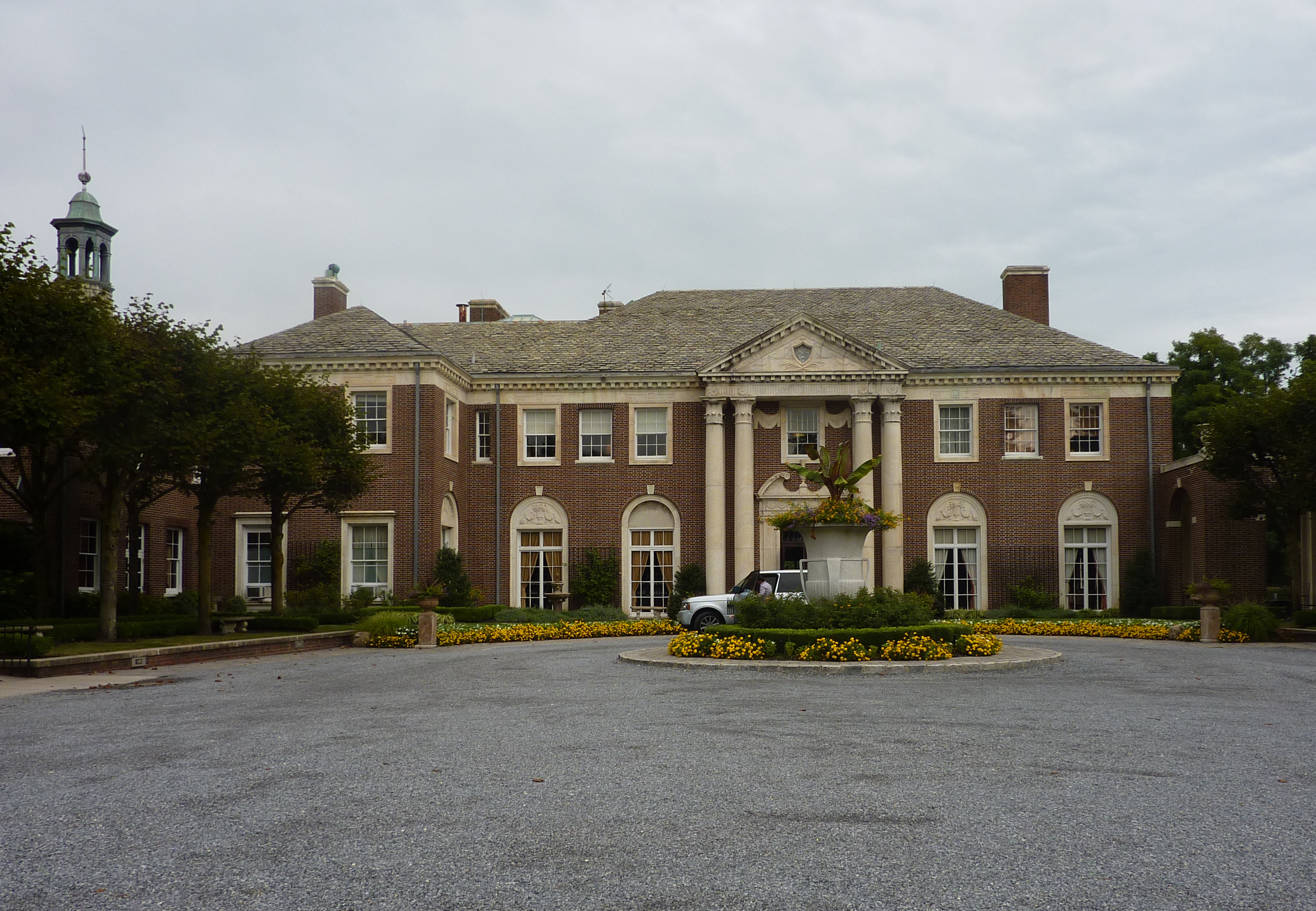
DuPont-Guest Estate, now known as the DeSeversky Center of NYIT's Old Westbury campus

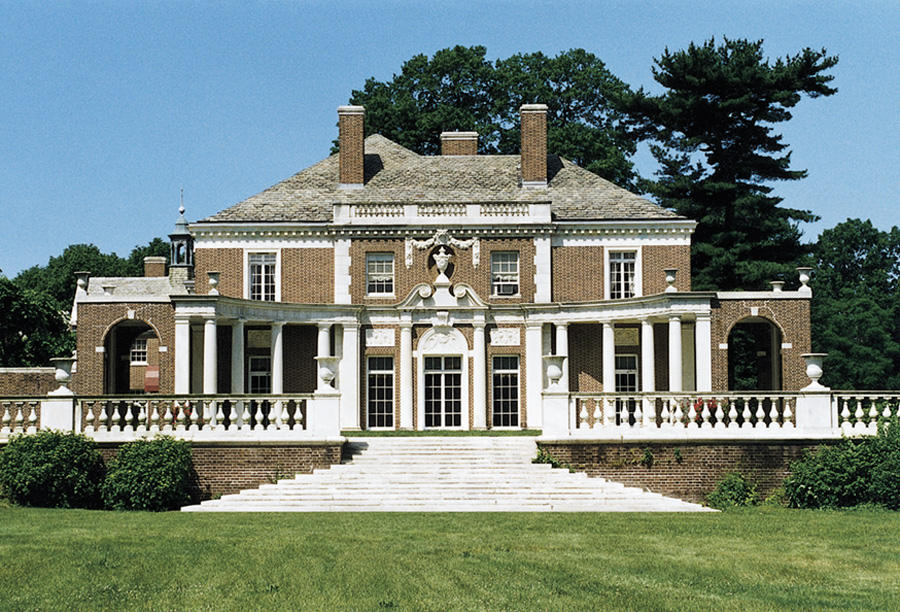
NYIT's DeSeversky Mansion, on its Old Westbury campus

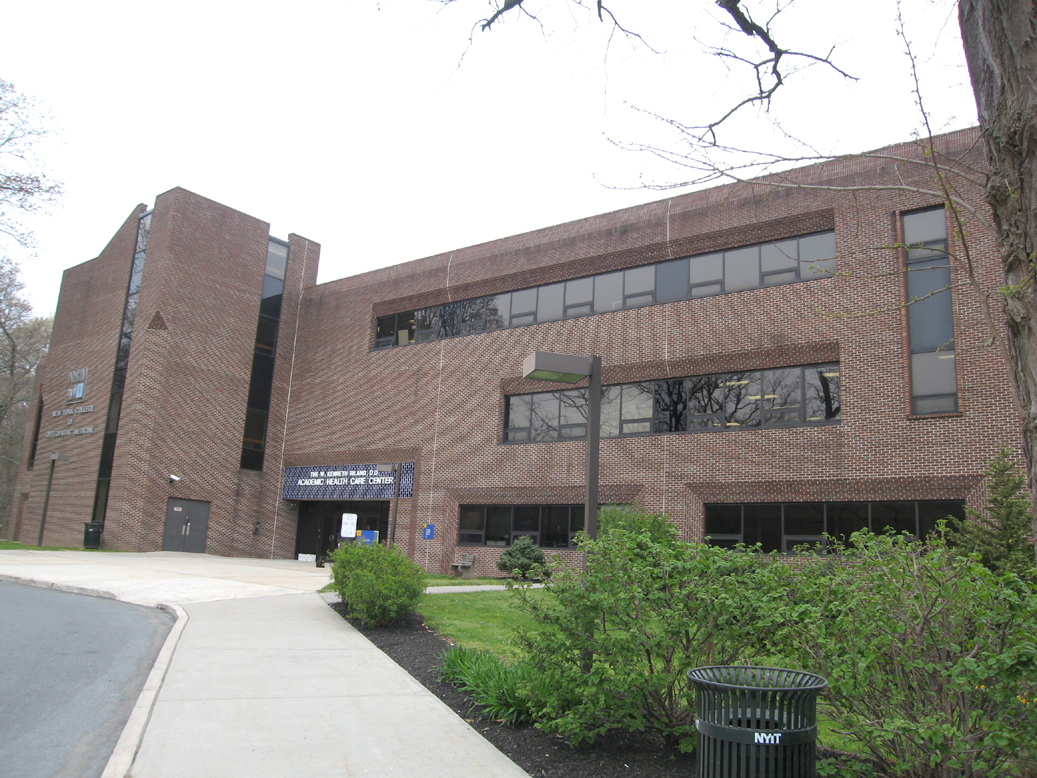
W. Kenneth Riland Academic Health Care Center on NYIT's Old Westbury campus

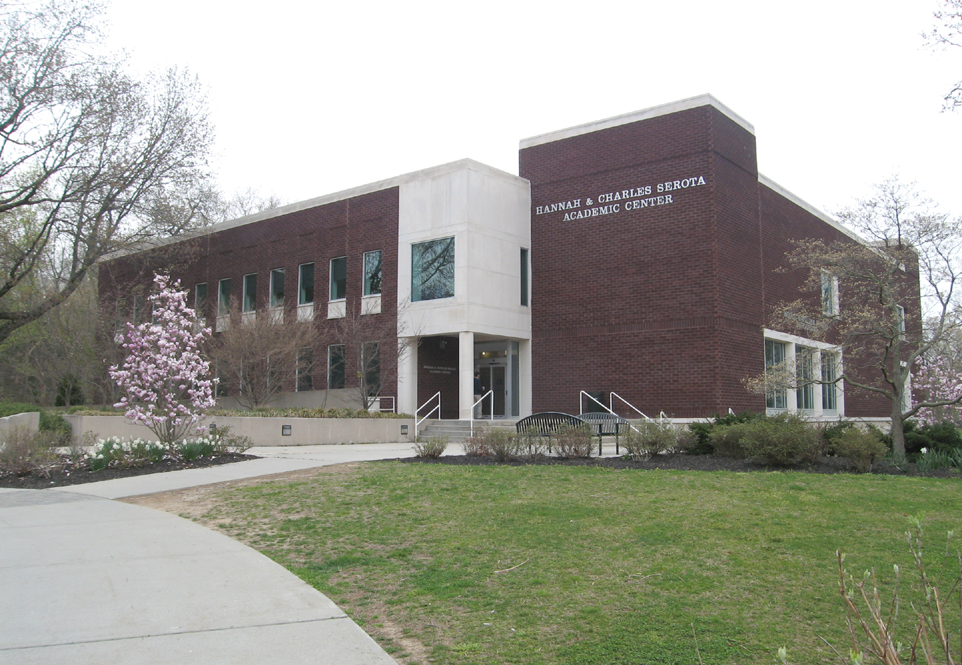
Hannah and Charles Serota Academic Center on NYIT's Old Westbury campus

New York Institute of Technology's Old Westbury, New York, campus is seated on 1,050 acres (425 ha). It encompasses numerous contiguous former estates situated in the wooded hillsides of Old Westbury, New York. Some of these estates were formerly owned by members of the Rockefeller family. Opened in 1965, the campus has many buildings including a sports complex, administrative and academic buildings, a 100-seat "smart" auditorium, several dining halls, a bookstore, as well as NYIT's de Seversky Mansion, a party and event venue on Long Island, and one of the largest houses in the United States. It was developed on and around the nucleus of the former C. V. Whitney estate and includes the former North Shore estates of "Templeton" and "Delbarton." Formerly, this included Flora Whitney's "French House." Today, most original buildings have been reconstructed for educational use while retaining the charm of traditional exteriors. To preserve the natural beauty of the landscape, other buildings are clustered in low, modern structures surrounded by trees and open vistas. Classroom buildings and parking areas are connected by walkways through woods and meadows untouched by construction. Plazas connect classroom buildings and act as outdoor rooms for students and faculty. Concerts, lectures, and informal recreational events are frequently scheduled on campus.

Athletic facilities at the Old Westbury campus include the 1,000-seat President's Stadium, the President's Field, the 500-seat Recreation Hall arena, the NYIT Softball Complex and the NYIT Tennis Complex consisting of six courts. Many notable people, including Patch Adams, spoke at Riland Auditorium on its Long Island campus. The Old Westbury campus is mainly a commuter campus, although residential students have dormitory options.

The Long Island campus is also home to the New York Institute of Technology College of Osteopathic Medicine, the only osteopathic medical school on Long Island, which was formerly named New York College of Osteopathic Medicine, or NYCOM. In 2008, NYIT installed a 3-D motion capture lab for its Fine Arts program in Old Westbury. The system allows the university to use Hollywood technology to teach the next generation of computer animators. Between 2009 and 2013, the Old Westbury campus has undergone a number of significant improvements, including renovation of the 3,000 sf. Student Activities Center, creation of a Life Sciences biomedical research laboratory, renovation of Engineering Materials lab, creation of a Nursing Simulation lab and creation of an 8,000 sf. Entrepreneurship and Technology Innovation Center, among others.

In 2015, NYIT received from New York State a grant for a portion of the costs required to renovate a 5,300-square-foot facility to house three new laboratories on its Old Westbury campus.

Free weekday shuttles between the Long Island Railroad (LIRR) stations in Manhasset and Hicksville and the Long Island campus are available to all NYIT students, faculty, and staff.

A new 80-room residence hall, located at 120 Jericho Turnpike in Jericho, opened in Fall 2024. A scenic 10–15 minute drive from the Old Westbury campus, this residence hall has modern rooms, a fitness center, laundry facilities and a swimming pool. Free shuttle service are available between the new residence hall and the Old Westbury campus.

=== New York City ===
The New York City campus is located between 60th and 62nd streets on Broadway, adjacent to Columbus Circle, across the street from Central Park and within walking distance of Lincoln Center for the Performing Arts. Its central location is accessible via subway and bus routes and is close to concert halls, theaters, museums, and libraries. It is served by public transit buses and the A, B, C, D, and 1 Subway trains, which are accessed at the 59th Street/Columbus Circle station. The New York City campus offers a full range of classes in all of NYIT's schools.

The campus comprises six buildings (excluding the residence halls):

- Edward Guiliano Global Center, 1855 Broadway,
- The New Technology Building, 16 W. 61st Street,
- 26 W. 61st Street,
- The Student Activities Building, 1849 Broadway,
- NYIT Auditorium on Broadway, 1871 Broadway,
- 33 W. 60th street

The Student Activity Building at 1849 Broadway, has a student lounge, recreation areas, food services, a bookstore, and the offices of the Student Government Association as well as other clubs and student organizations. The Office of Student Activities is located on the second floor. The NYIT Auditorium on Broadway has a seating capacity of 268. The offices of Counseling and Wellness Services, Disability Services, Campus Life, Career Services, Student Employment, and Housing and Residential Life, are located at 26 West 61st Street. In 2014, NYIT opened a simulated trading floor, equipped with the latest technologies, including hardware, software, databases and datafeeds, on the fifth floor of the 26 W. 61st Street building. The Student Solutions Center (Enrollment Services, Bursar, Financial Aid, and Registrar) and International Education are located in the New Technology Building, 16 West 61st Street.

The New York City campus is home to student clubs and organizations such as Students Working to Achieve Greatness, Phi Iota Alpha, the Allied Health Life Science Organization, Bear Hug Club, Student Nurses Association, Dance Club, American Medical Student Association, Student Programming Association, Society of Hosteurs, and American Institute for Architecture Students.

Residential students have one dormitory option for the Manhattan campus: 525 Lexington Avenue which is supervised by full-time staff.

NYIT Auditorium on Broadway, currently closed, hosts events including the Lumen Prize Exhibition and the SAG-AFTRA Foundation's Conversation Series, bringing in celebrities such as Carey Mulligan, Gloria Steinem, Meryl Streep, Mark Ruffalo, and Leslee Udwin among others to NYIT's campus in Manhattan. NYIT Auditorium on Broadway has 3-D screening capabilities. In January 2020, the auditorium was flooded and suffered substantial damage after a water main under the adjacent street ruptured.

=== Central Islip ===
New York Tech purchased more than 500 acres of the former Central Islip Psychiatric Center in 1984 to establish a campus in Suffolk County, New York. Less than 10 years later, the school began selling pieces off for commercial use. In 2005, NYIT ceased operations as a full college campus there. At one point, the location included residence halls with student lounges and laundry facilities, dining hall, classroom buildings, and library. The school still operates its 7,000-square-foot Family Health Care Center, located in Central Islip near the former campus, to serve the local community. Aluminaire House was located on this campus. NYIT donated about 100 acres to Suffolk County for its Cohalan Court Complex.

=== Jonesboro, Arkansas ===
In March 2014, NYIT announced plans to open an osteopathic medical school site in Jonesboro, Arkansas, by acquiring and renovating a building belonging to Arkansas State University-Jonesboro, for approximately $13 million. The distinctive three-story yellow brick building, the Wilson Hall at Arkansas State University, once housed the university's library, auditorium (complete with balcony seating), and administrative offices as well as the laboratories, kitchens, studios, sewing rooms, classrooms, and offices that served all departments of the arts and sciences. In April 2015, Commission on Osteopathic College Accreditation awarded initial approval for the osteopathic medical school site in Jonesboro. In December 2015, NYIT's College of Osteopathic Medicine received final approval from Commission on Osteopathic College Accreditation to recruit students, open a second location on the campus of Arkansas State University in August 2016 and become the first osteopathic medical school in Arkansas. This campus is currently in operation.

=== Other facilities ===
NYIT formerly had research centers in Florida. In 2011, NYIT's College of Osteopathic Medicine opened a Family Health Care Center in Central Islip, New York, and in 2014, NYIT's College of Osteopathic Medicine opened another Family Health Care Center in Uniondale, New York. NYIT opened a cybersecurity center in Old Westbury, New York in 2017.

=== Global programs ===
In addition to its United States locations, New York Institute of Technology has a presence in the following countries:

==== China ====
===== Nanjing =====
NYIT-Nanjing was established in collaboration with Nanjing University of Posts and Telecommunications. NYIT-Nanjing students have access to Nanjing University of Posts and Telecommunications residence halls, dining facilities, and activities. NYIT's campus is separate but joined with the campus of Nanjing University of Posts and Telecommunications. The courses are taught in English, and students get the equivalent of an American degree without the expense of traveling abroad. Graduates have an option to earn 'parallel degrees' from NYIT and NUPT or, if they choose, just the NYIT degree. Students can study solely in Nanjing or can opt to take some of their courses at NYIT campuses in New York. Enrollment at NYIT-Nanjing is projected to eventually reach 6,000.

===== Beijing =====
Faculty of International Media of Communication University of China (commonly referred to as ICUC) is a Ministry of Education in China-approved Media Technology Center that NYIT launched with the Communication University of China in Beijing in 2015. It is the first China-foreign, cooperatively-run institution in media approved by the Ministry of Education. It offers dual-degree graduate and undergraduate programs.

Students are taught first by Beijing-based NYIT and Communication University of China faculty members and then have the option to complete their studies at NYIT's New York campuses. The campus includes NYIT-designed digital laboratories and a distance-learning, video-presence classroom connected to NYIT's New York campuses. NYIT students in Beijing are able to remotely operate equipment in NYIT's high-tech Home for Innovation, Visualization, and Exploration (HIVE) Center in New York with its motion capture, 3-D, and visualization tools.

The interconnectivity of the New York and Beijing programs enables students and faculty members to collaborate on creative projects and reviews. The NYIT-CUC programs are highly selective, and students chosen from throughout China had to meet both NYIT and CUC admissions standards, including the ability to take their courses in English. The curriculum and requirements of each program are identical to NYIT courses and programs offered in New York.

===== Sites =====
New York Tech offers M.B.A. programs in conjunction with Jiangxi University of Finance and Economics in Nanchang, Shanghai, and Shenzhen.

==== Canada (closing) ====
NYIT-Vancouver offered graduate degrees and had two campus locations: first, in downtown Vancouver, and then in a suburban locale in East Vancouver. In December 2022, New York Tech-Vancouver closed its downtown location and moved into an expanded and redesigned space at Broadway Tech Centre due to persistent enrollment growth. The new campus totaled nearly 40,000 square feet across three different buildings, which are connected by covered walkways.

NYIT-Vancouver's enrollment of international students declined from 1,087 in 2025 to 106 in 2026, as a result of the Canadian government's reduction in the availability of international study permits In February 2026, it announced that it would close, with current students continuing their studies only through online education.

==== Bahrain (closed) ====
NYIT-Manama offered undergraduate and graduate degrees until 2014 in fields including business, computer graphics, engineering, and interior design.

==== Jordan (closed) ====
NYIT-Amman offered until 2013 undergraduate and graduate degrees in fields including business, computer graphics, engineering, and information technology.

==== United Arab Emirates (closed) ====
NYIT-Abu Dhabi was located in the CERT Technology Park. NYIT-Abu Dhabi had a library collection, catering services and parking facilities. Notable people who spoke at NYIT-Abu Dhabi included U.S. Secretary of Education Margaret Spellings. NYIT-Abu Dhabi stopped enrolling new students in 2018.

== Organization and administration ==
NYIT's undergraduate and graduate programs are divided into six schools and colleges. Collaboration among the schools and colleges is frequent, as mandated by a number of interdisciplinary degree programs and research centers.

=== Schools and colleges ===
New York Tech comprises the following academic schools and colleges:

- School of Architecture and Design
- College of Art and Sciences
- College of Engineering and Computing Sciences
- School of Health Professions
- School of Management
- College of Osteopathic Medicine

The now-defunct Ellis College of NYIT was created as an online division operating under the university's mission to provide career-oriented professional education and access to opportunity. In the fall of 2008, NYIT phased out its Ellis College branch, which for another nine years operated separately as Ellis University until it ceased operations altogether in 2017.

== Academics ==
Of faculty at NYIT, 95% hold their doctorate or other terminal degree. NYIT holds full accreditation in over 50 academic areas. Nationally, fewer than 100 colleges and universities match this achievement. The New York Tech School of Architecture and Design is the only school of architecture and design in the New York metropolitan area with fully accredited programmes in both architecture and interior design.

New York Tech offers cross-registration programs with elite educational institutions such as Princeton University, Columbia University and Cornell University.

=== Demographics ===
The student body has over 7,700 graduate and undergraduate students and around 1,000 academic faculty. The student body at NYIT is 55% male and 45% female.

=== Libraries ===
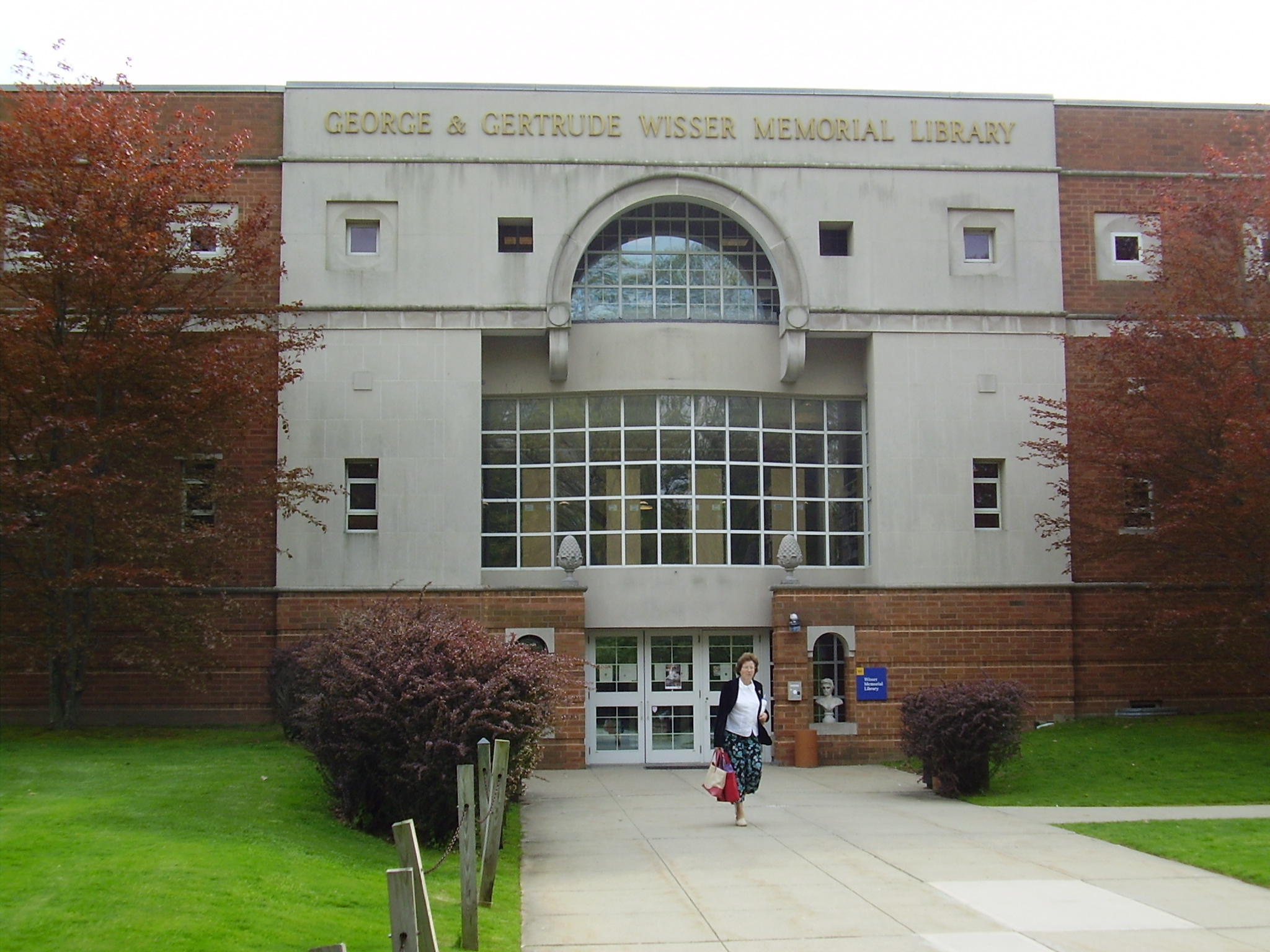
The George and Gertrude Wisser Memorial Library, on the Old Westbury campus

The New York campuses include four libraries:

- George and Gertrude Wisser Memorial Library,
- Art and Architecture Library at Education Hall,
- College of Osteopathic Medicine Library,
- 1855 Broadway Library,

Access to the collection of books, periodicals and journals is open to registered NYIT students and alumni. Onsite use of special collections is also available to visiting students and researchers. NYIT collections include more than 100,000 books, 200 databases, 13,000 ebooks, and videos.

=== Rankings ===
Academic rankings

National
- U.S. News & World Report: 219 of 428

Ranked 57th in Top Performers on Social Mobility in National Universities category by U.S. News & World Report.

In its 2027 rankings, U.S. News & World Report ranked New York Tech 219th among national universities in the United States.

The Georgetown University Center on Education and the Workforce ranks NYIT in the top 10% among all colleges and universities in the U.S. for return on investment.

In 2025, NYIT has been designated an Opportunity College and University – Higher Access, Higher Earnings in the Student Access and Earnings Classification by Carnegie Classification. This classification acknowledges institutions that produce strong economic outcomes — schools that serve as models for fostering student success. Only 16% of U.S. institutions received this designation.

=== Study abroad ===
In addition to NYIT's auxiliary campuses in Canada, China, and the Middle East, NYIT has degree partnerships with over a dozen Chinese universities, as well as with universities in France, Taiwan, Brazil, India and Turkey. NYIT also has student exchange programs with universities in Denmark, Netherlands, China, United Kingdom, India, Costa Rica, Germany, Brazil, and France.

=== Admissions ===
U.S. News & World Report describes New York Institute of Technology's admissions process as "more selective".

In the undergraduate admission season for Fall 2024 entry, there were 13,237 applicants. The middle 50 percent SAT Composite scores of enrolled students were 1250–1430. The middle 50 percent ACT Composite score of enrolled students was between 25 and 33. The average high-school GPA of enrolled students was 3.6 on a 4.0 scale.

=== Accreditation ===
==== Overall accreditation and charter ====
- Commission on Higher Education of the Middle States Association of Colleges and Schools (all campuses)
- New York Institute of Technology is chartered by the Board of Regents of the University of the State of New York

==== Campus-specific accreditations, licensures, and approvals ====
NYIT-China is accredited by the Ministry of Education of China.

NYIT-United Arab Emirates is accredited by the Ministry Of Higher Education & Scientific Research of UAE.

NYIT-Canada is accredited by the Ministry of Advanced Education of British Columbia.

NYIT-Bahrain was accredited by the Ministry of Higher Education and Scientific Research of Bahrain, as well as the Ministry of Higher Education of Kuwait.

NYIT-Jordan was accredited by the Ministry of Higher Education and Scientific Research of Jordan.

=== Research ===
The Office of Sponsored Programs and Research works with faculty members and students to apply for funding to support research programs. Research is organized under the Office of the Vice Provost for Research, Jared E. Littman, Ph.D. In 2022, NYIT maintained annual sponsored research expenditures of approximately $60 million. To date, NYIT has received funding from public, private, and government agencies, including among others:

- National Institutes of Health
- National Science Foundation
- New York State Department of Health
- New York State Education Department
- U.S. Department of Defense
- U.S. Health Resources and Services Administration
- U.S. Department of Commerce
- U.S. Department of Energy

==== Interdisciplinary graduate centers ====
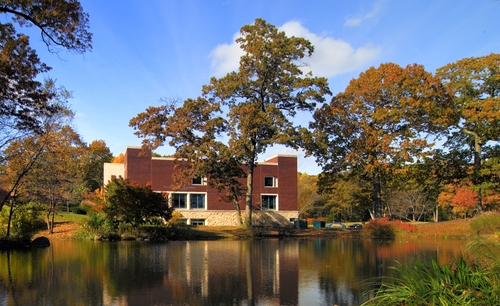
New York Institute of Technology College of Osteopathic Medicine

New York Tech's academic centers focus on interdisciplinary research and bring together departments, faculty, and students for collaborations and exchanges of ideas.

In 1981, NYIT's Center for Robotics Research opened at the Old Westbury campus.

In 1998, NYIT's College of Osteopathic Medicine opened the Adele Smithers Parkinson's Disease Center. NYIT's College of Osteopathic Medicine uses 3-D motion capture technology to help doctors better identify mobility and stability problems in patients with Parkinson's disease.

The Center for Global Health opened in 2007. Students in medicine, allied health, and engineering have traveled to Haiti and Ghana, where they help deliver babies and provide fresh water as part of NYIT's Center for Global Health program.

The Center for Labor and Industrial Relations provides training and research into workplace related issues.

The Center for Gerontology and Geriatrics collaborates with the academic community, government, civic, professional and business groups, and funders.

In 2015, NYIT Center for Sports Medicine opened at the Old Westbury campus.

NYIT opened a cybersecurity center in Old Westbury, New York in 2017.

In 2023, the Ferrara Center for Patient Safety and Clinical Simulation opened at NYIT. NYIT alumnus Daniel Ferrara (D.O. ’86) supported the center with a $1 million gift.

NYIT's faculty and students have conducted research with such institutions as the Cold Spring Harbor Laboratory, Brookhaven National Laboratory, Memorial Sloan-Kettering Cancer Center, Los Alamos National Laboratory, and other organizations around the world.

==== Biomedical Research, Innovation, and Imaging Center (BRIIC) ====
The research facility, named Biomedical Research, Innovation, and Imaging Center (BRIIC), houses among others, open laboratory space with many lab benches, core labs, fume hoods, tissue culture rooms, labs for tissue engineering, a freezer room, an autoclave, a multicolor 3-D STED (stimulated emission depletion) microscope and a 2,000-square-foot functional magnetic resonance imaging (fMRI) suite dedicated solely for research purposes.

==== Industry connections ====
NYIT maintains close ties to the industrial world. Many of these connections are made through NYIT's cooperative education and internship programs. For example, in 2017, NYIT opened a cybersecurity lab in Old Westbury, New York, the first lab on Long Island designated as a National Center of Academic Excellence in Cyber Defense by the National Security Agency and the Department of Homeland Security.

The Entrepreneurship & Technology Innovation Center for Industry-University Partnerships at NYIT is structured around a collaborative network of industry-university partnerships, connecting industry and academia, innovators and entrepreneurs, the Entrepreneurship and Technology Innovation Center (ETIC) is a catalyst for technological innovation, entrepreneurship, and economic development. The ETIC focuses on three technological drivers of economic growth in the New York metropolitan region:

- Information & Cybersecurity
- Energy & Green Technologies
- Bio-Engineering and Medical Devices

The Empire State Development Corporation has provided seed funding for the initiative, which is supported by the Long Island Regional Economic Development Council. An Advisory Board made up of members of industry, government, and the venture capital community, has agreed to help NYIT create the center and work on its three focus areas create a high-tech teaching and research environment.

== Student life ==
=== Traditions ===
NYIT has few formal traditions, compared to many other universities, but has a rich culture of informal traditions and jargon. There are a few "big events" such as Commencement (graduation), but many smaller, decentralized activities sponsored by departments, labs, living groups, student activities, and ad hoc groups of NYIT community members united by common interests.

=== Housing ===
The Office of Residence Life and Off-Campus Housing at New York Institute of Technology caters for students living in residence halls and independently in housing off-campus.

=== Student government ===
NYIT's Student Government Association (SGA) is the official voice of the student body. The SGA advocates on behalf of student interests—academic, cultural, and social. It is charged with working with the college's faculty and administration to improve campus life. In addition, the SGA oversees the budgeting process for student clubs and organizations and supports a variety of campus-wide events.

=== Student media ===
==== LI News Tonight ====
LI News Tonight is a nightly television newscast produced on the Old Westbury campus as both a community service to Nassau and Suffolk counties and an internship opportunity where students can learn about careers in television news. For more than 25 years, college interns have covered breaking news and feature events alongside reporters and photographers from professional news stations, with their work appearing that evening on a nightly TV newscast aired on a Long Island cable station. Notable internees at LI News Tonight include Diana Perez.

==== Globesville ====
Globesville is NYIT's student-run web channel. It is an online network of students that uses the power of social media to integrate NYIT campuses, students and alumni from across the globe. The Globesville team creates and collects video and features which focus on the activities, interests, and goals of the NYIT community.

==== Campus newspapers ====
On the Old Westbury campus, NYIT students produce The Campus Slate, the student-run newspaper founded in 1966. The Campus Slate conducted interviews with celebrities such as Oscar-nominated actress Diane Lane and The Beach Boys. On the Manhattan campus, students produce the NYIT Chronicle, a student-run newspaper founded in 2005. On the Central Islip campus, students produced the Campus Voice, a student-run newspaper founded in 1992.

==== NYIT Magazine ====
NYIT Magazine is the official magazine of New York Institute of Technology. The magazine features articles on topics relevant to alumni and the community, and includes news of events, research, sports coverage, and profiles as professor and alumni accomplishments. The magazine is published three times a year.

==== WNYT ====
Radio station WNYT was formed shortly after NYIT opened its Old Westbury campus in the mid-1960s, operating from studios located in Education Hall. The student-run station has alternately broadcast on campus via carrier current and closed circuit connections, and during the 1970s and early 1980s, it served as the audio for Cablevision's on-screen program guide. Today, WNYT is heard online, with Internet-based programming via RealAudio.

WNYT Radio broadcasts many of the NYIT Bears sports broadcasts, giving more exposure to the station.

=== Greek life ===
==== Fraternities ====
- Phi Iota Alpha
- Alpha Chi Rho
- Tau Kappa Epsilon
- Iota Nu Delta
- Zeta Beta Tau
- Delta Sigma Phi
- Delta Epsilon Psi
- Alpha Phi Alpha
- Zeta Eta
- Upsilon Mu

==== Sororities ====
- Alpha Sigma Tau
- Zeta Phi Beta
- Kappa Phi Gamma
- Sigma Iota Alpha
- Eta Chi Gamma

==== Coed ====
DiGamma Omega Xi

=== ROTC ===
NYIT has an ROTC program, including both Air Force Reserve Officers' Training Corps and Army Reserve Officers Training Corps.

== Athletics ==
The New York Tech (NYIT) athletic teams are called the Bears. The institute was a member of the NCAA Division II ranks, primarily competing in the East Coast Conference (ECC; originally called as the New York Collegiate Athletic Conference (NYCAC) until after the 2005–06 academic year) from 1989–90 until their last season of competition in the 2019–20 school year before the institute announced its suspension until further notice.

NYIT sponsored an intercollegiate competitive athletics program with 13 varsity teams. Men's sports included baseball, basketball, cross country, lacrosse, soccer and track & field; while women's sports included basketball, cross country, lacrosse, soccer, softball and track & field; its lacrosse team was a four-time NCAA Division II national champion team and, in 2019, NYIT became a College World Series team in baseball.

NYIT announced in August 2020 that the Bears would suspend its NCAA Division II intercollegiate athletics for at least two years. However, it didn't return to active competition, as of the 2022–23 academic year. In June 2026, NYIT announced it would return to competition, sponsoring a sprint football team as part of the Collegiate Sprint Football League.

== Notable people ==
=== Alumni ===
The New York Institute of Technology has nearly 114,000 alumni around the world, as of 2023.

Those recently in the spotlight include Kevin O'Connor (D.O. '96), personal physician to Joe Biden; Karine Jean-Pierre (B.S. '98), press secretary for the Biden administration; David Barnea, the current Director of the Mossad; and Claudia Coplein (D.O. '92), Tyson Foods' first chief medical officer.

Many have gone into business and finance, including: Vincent L. Sadusky, Chief Executive Officer at Univision Communications Inc; John Antioco, CEO, Blockbuster Video, Chairman, Board of Directors, Red Mango; Richard J. Daly, CEO, Broadridge Financial Solutions; Linda Davila, Chairperson, First Vice President, Investments Merrill Lynch; Eli Wachtel, Managing Director, Bear Stearns; Gary S. Lynch, managing director, Marsh & McLennan Companies; Itzhak Fisher, executive vice president, Nielsen Holdings, he also founded and served as CEO of RSL Communications, an over $1.5-billion telecommunications company with over 2,500 employees in 22 countries; Steve Johnson, Director for Labor Relations at The Coca-Cola Company; Robert E. Evanson, President, McGraw-Hill Education; Jerry Romano, chairman, New York Emmy Awards; Monte N. Redman, CEO, Astoria Financial; Patricia McMahon, vice president and general manager at Northrop Grumman, and vice president and general manager at BAE Systems; Indera Rampal-Harrod, director of human resources, American Express; Roseann Stichnoth, executive vice president and head of the Financial Services Group at the Federal Reserve Bank of New York; Chen Ningning, self-made billionaire; and Matthew F. Calamari, Executive Vice President and Chief Operating Officer of Trump Organization.

Some alumni have entered academia, including: Kyriacos A. Athanasiou, Chair of the Biomedical Engineering department at University of California, Davis; Ken Pugh, professor at Yale University; Jill Wruble, professor at Yale University; Peter Ruggiero, professor at Columbia University; Jeannie Liakaris, Assistant Dean at New York University; Michael Patrick Meehan, professor at New York University; Robert Cohen, professor at New York University; Manish Sharma, professor at Cornell University; Frank LoVecchio, professor and medical director of Clinical Research at College of Health Solutions of Arizona State University; and Judith Barry, professor and the director of the MIT Program in Art, Culture and Technology at the Massachusetts Institute of Technology and Guggenheim Award winner.

Alumni in science and technology include: Eric Cole, chief technology officer at McAfee and chief scientist at Lockheed Martin Corporation; Peter A. Eckstein, Senior Principal Engineer, Northrop Grumman Corporation. IEEE Board of Directors member, and 2016 IEEE President; Steven Wolk, chief technology officer, P. C. Richard & Son; Michael McCrackan, Research and Development Director, Kodak; Vincent Connare, font designer and former Microsoft employee, amongst his creations are the Comic Sans font, and the Trebuchet MS font; James Chemp, Director of engineering and energy, 7-Eleven; Philip Fasano, executive vice president and chief information officer at American International Group (AIG); and Patri Friedman, Software Engineer at Google.

Alumni in government include: Joseph Saladino, New York state assemblyman; Anthony Seminerio, politician; Averof Neofytou, Cypriot politician who has been President of the governing Democratic Rally (DISY) party since 2013. Former Minister of Communications and Works and Mayor of Polis Chrysochou; Andre Pierre, former Democratic mayor of North Miami; Rafael Piñeiro, First Deputy Commissioner of the New York City Police Department (NYPD); Brian M. McLaughlin, New York state assemblyman; Nicholas Estavillo, NYPD Chief of Patrol; Tom Cilmi, Suffolk County Legislator; Keith Kazmark, Mayor of Woodland Park, New Jersey; H.E Abdulla Bin Mohamed Bin Butti Al Hamed, Chairman of the Department of Health in the Emirate of Abu Dhabi and a member of Abu Dhabi Executive Council; Abubakar Kabir Bichi, member of the Nigerian Federal House of Representatives and Thani Ahmed Alzeyoudi, Minister of Climate Change and Environment for the United Arab Emirates.

Many of NYIT's alumni have also gone into arts, journalism and entertainment. They include Rahul Dholakia, film director-producer-screenwriter; Lori Bizzoco, writer; Patti Ann Browne, TV News Anchor, Fox News; Jim Geoghan, Emmy-nominated executive producer of The Disney Channel's The Suite Life on Deck and the original The Suite Life of Zack and Cody; Emmy Award-winning broadcast journalists Judy Martin, Dana Arschin, and Ben Finley who is the Editorial Producer with “Anderson Cooper 360” and has produced for several CNN and PBS programs; Brian Kenny, ESPN SportsCenter Anchor; Candice Night, lead singer, Blackmore's Night; and Adam Pascal, actor, singer, and producer.

Alumni in sports include: Allison Baver, Olympic Speed Skating Medalist (Bronze, 2010); Don Cooper, head pitching coach, Chicago White Sox; Jim Ferry, basketball coach; Sarah Fisher, race car driver; Joe Vasold, lacrosse player; Ray Giannelli, baseball player; Manix Auriantal, professional basketball player; Chris Algieri, professional boxer in the Light Welterweight division; Allen Watson, former Major League Baseball pitcher (member of 2000 World Series Champion New York Yankees); and Brian Brady (baseball), former right fielder in Major League Baseball who played for the California Angels.

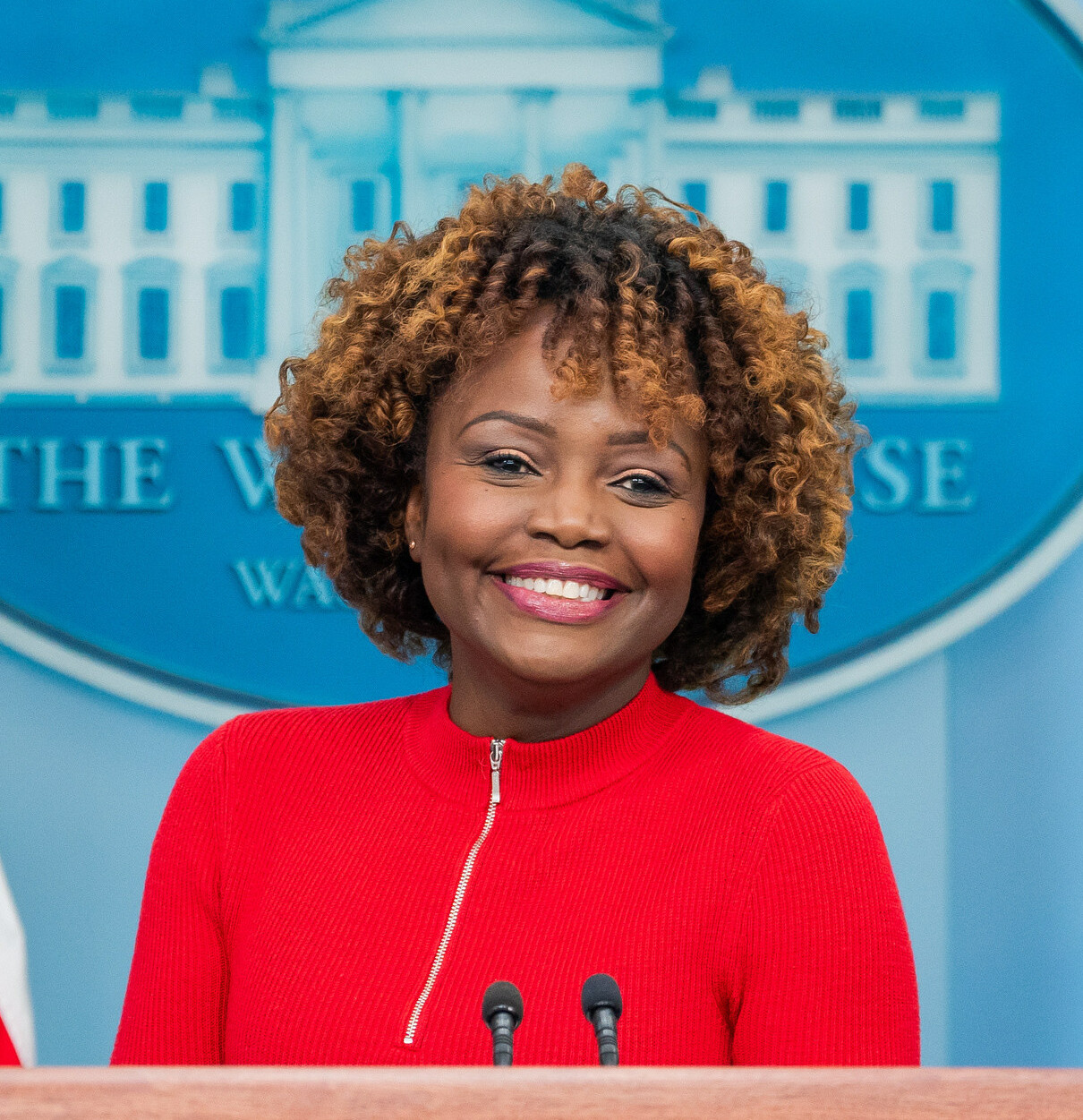
Alumna Karine Jean-Pierre is an American political advisor who served as the White House press secretary.

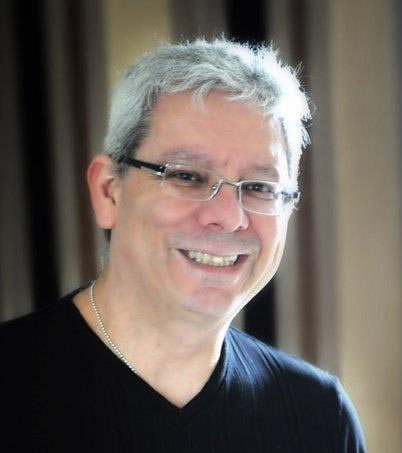
Alumnus Vincent Connare, Microsoft employee. Amongst his creations are the Comic Sans font, and the Trebuchet MS font.

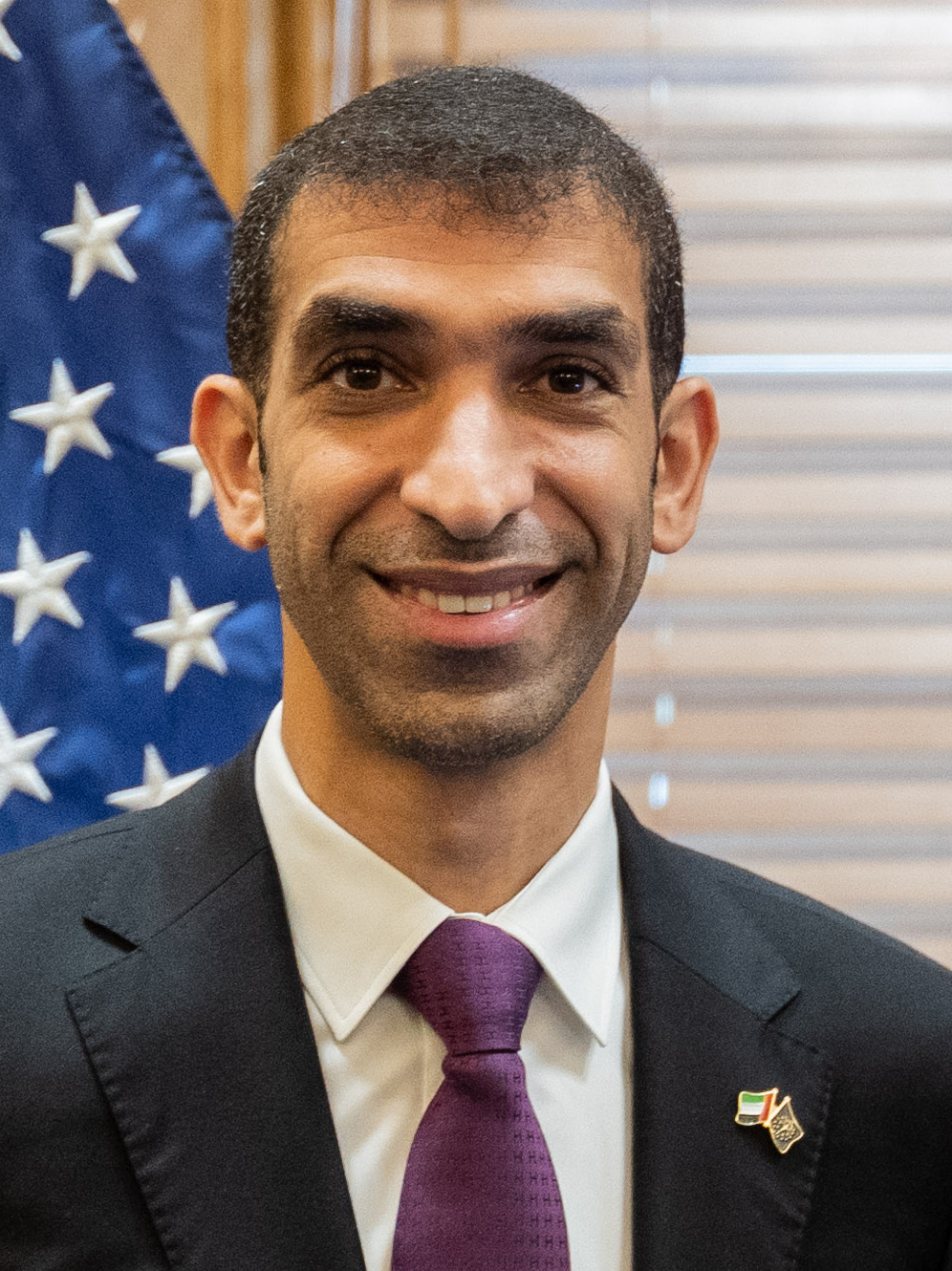
Alumnus Thani bin Ahmed Al Zeyoudi is the present Minister of State for Foreign Trade of the United Arab Emirates.

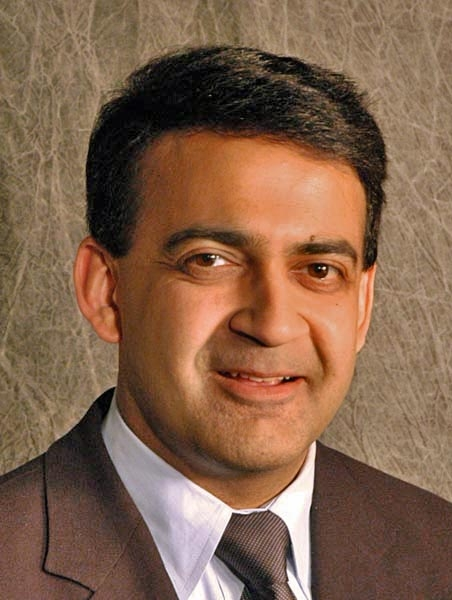
Alumnus Humayun Chaudhry, physician and CEO, Federation of State Medical Boards.

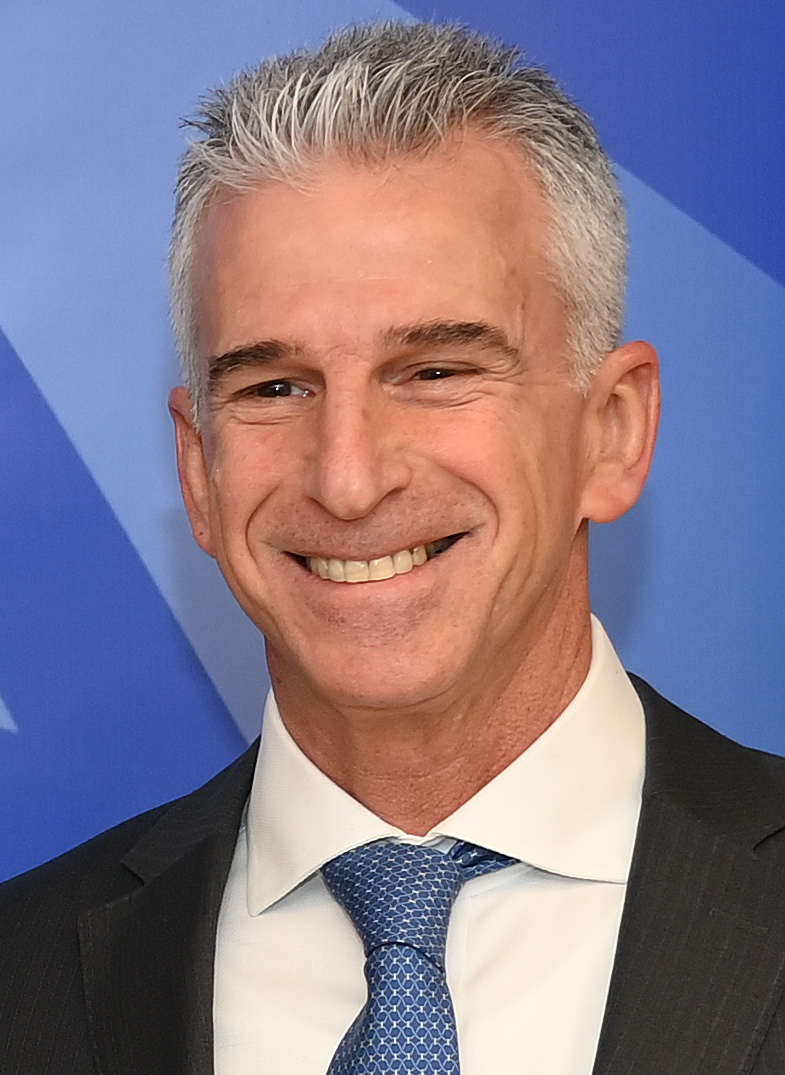
Alumnus David Barnea, the current Director of the Mossad.

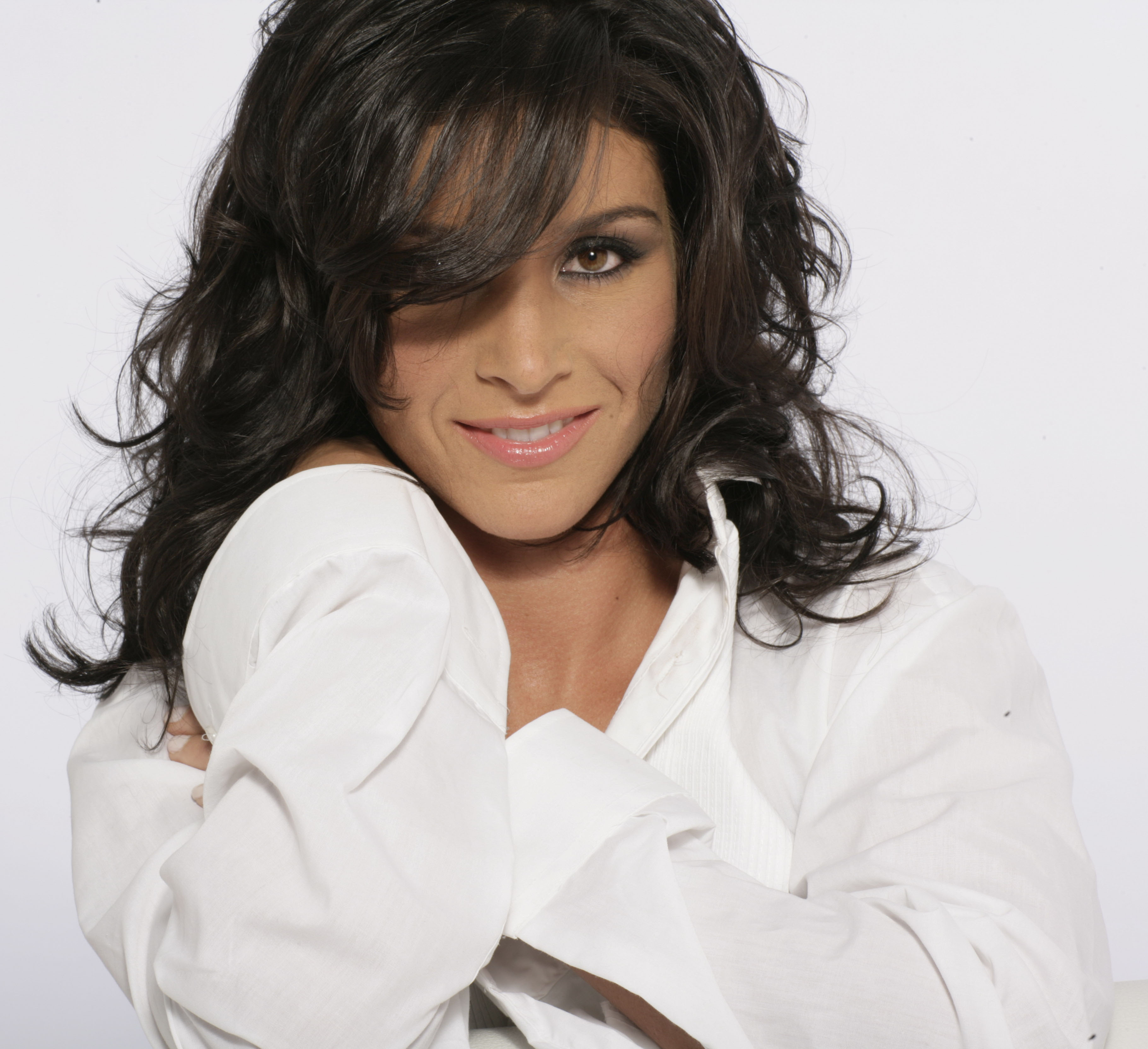
Alumna Allison Baver, an American short track speed skater and Olympic medalist.

=== Faculty ===
- Reino Aarnio, architect
- Lance Williams, graphics researcher
- Bernard Fryshman, physicist
- Ralph Guggenheim, video graphics designer
- Jim Blinn, computer scientist known for his work as a computer graphics expert at NASA's Jet Propulsion Laboratory
- Edwin Catmull, computer scientist and current president of Pixar Animation Studios and Walt Disney Animation Studios. Turing Award winner
- James H. Clark, entrepreneur and computer scientist, founded companies, including Netscape Communications Corporation
- Alvy Ray Smith, pioneer in computer graphics
- Mehrdad Izady, contemporary writer on ethnic and cultural topics, particularly the Greater Middle East, and Kurds
- Lynn Rogoff, film and television producer, and stage playwright, theatre director and professor
- Harvey Jerome Brudner, theoretical physicist/engineer
- Sheldon D. Fields, scientist
- Frank Genese, architect
- Ernie Anastos, won 28 Emmy Awards and nominations, and was nominated for the Edward R. Murrow Award for excellence in writing
- Pat Hanrahan, computer graphics researcher
- Rebecca Allen, international artist
- Frederic Parke, creator of the first CG physically modeled human face
- Carter Burwell, composer of film scores
- Barbara, Lady Judge, Chairman Emeritus of the UK Atomic Energy Authority
- David DiFrancesco, photoscientist, inventor, cinematographer, and photographer.
- Jacques Stroweis, visual effects artist and computer scientist
- Andrew Glassner, American expert in computer graphics
- Bruce Perens, computer programmer and advocate in the free software movement
- Harry Hurwitz, film director, screenwriter, actor and producer
- Morrie Yohai, food company executive best known for his creation of Cheez Doodles
- Joel B. Snyder, served as the Institute of Electrical and Electronics Engineers president
- W. Kenneth Riland, osteopathic physician (D.O.) whose patients included 37th president of the United States Richard Nixon and Nelson A. Rockefeller
- Manfred Kirchheimer, documentary film maker
- Ed Emshwiller, visual artist
- William E. Glenn, inventor known for his contributions to imaging technology. He was awarded 136 U.S. patents.
- Tom Duff, computer programmer
- Franklin C. Crow, computer scientist
- John Lewis, computer scientist

=== Presidents and provosts ===
Presidents
Name	Tenure
Alexander Schure	1955–1982
Matthew Schure	1982–2000
Edward Guiliano	2000–2016
Rahmat Shoureshi	January 2017–May 2017
Hank Foley	June 2017–June 2025
Jerry Balentine	July 2025–present

Provosts
Name	Tenure
Alexandra W. Logue	
Rahmat Shoureshi	2011 – 2016

== In popular culture ==
NYIT's campuses have been the backdrop for movies such as Arthur and Three Days of the Condor and TV shows including Gossip Girl and Four Weddings.

== See also ==
- Tubby the Tuba, a 1975 animated feature film produced by NYIT.
- The Works, a shelved film which was under development by NYIT. It would have been the first entirely 3D CGI film in history had it been finished.
- Dead Sands, a film produced by NYIT.
