= Interact Home Computer =

1978 American home computer

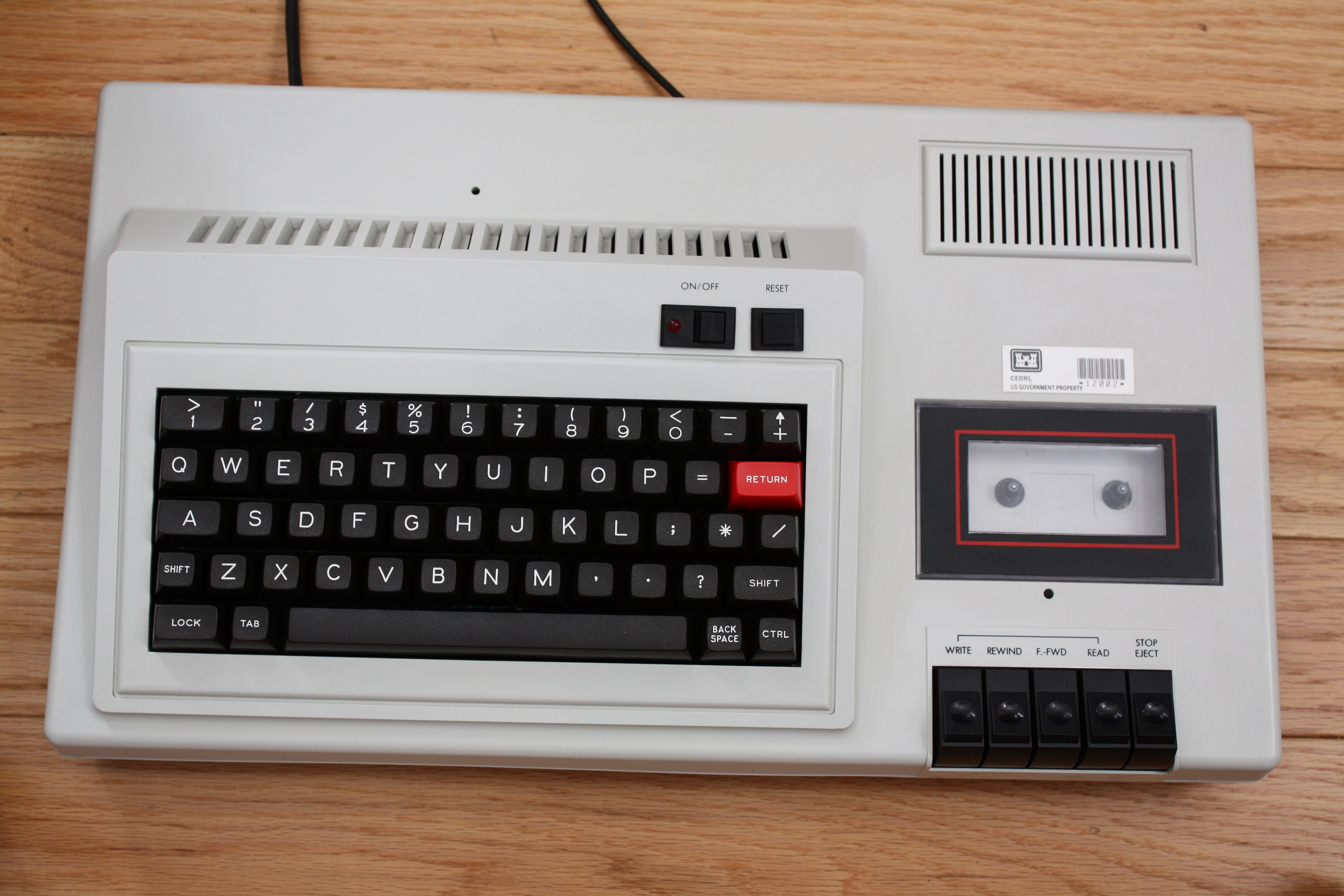
- Late-model Interact Model One with mechanical keyboard (U.S. government asset tag applied)
- Also known as: The Interact Family Computer, Interact Model One Home Computer
- Developer: Interact Electronics Inc.
- Type: Home computer
- Released: 1978; 48 years ago
- Introductory price: $449.99
- Units sold: Thousands sold
- Media: Built-in cassette recorder (1200 Bps)
- Operating system: Microsoft BASIC V4.7 or EDU-BASIC (loaded from tape)
- CPU: Intel I8080 @ 2.0 MHz
- Memory: 8 KB RAM
- Display: 17 x 12 text in eight colors, 112 x 78 graphics in four colors
- Sound: SN76477 (one voice, four octaves)
- Input: Keyboard

The Interact Home Computer (also called The Interact Family Computer) is a 1978 American home computer made by Interact Electronics, Inc., of Ann Arbor, Michigan. It sold under the name "Interact Model One Home Computer". The original Interact Model One computer was designed by Rick Barnich and Tim Anderson at 204 E. Washington in Ann Arbor, then moving to the Georgetown Mall on Packard St. in Ann Arbor.

Interact Electronics Inc was a privately held company that was funded by Hongiman, Miller, Swartz and Cohn, a law firm out of Detroit. The President/Founder of Interact Electronics Inc was Ken Lochner, who was one of the original developers of the BASIC language based out of Dartmouth College. Ken had started Interact Electronics Inc after founding the successful computer time-sharing company Cyphernetics in Ann Arbor, which was purchased by ADP in 1975.

The Interact Model One Home Computer debuted at the Consumer Electronics Show in Chicago in June 1978, at a price of US$499 (equivalent to $2,500 in 2025). Only a few thousand Interacts were sold before the company went bankrupt in late 1979. Most were sold by the liquidator Protecto Enterprizes of Barrington, Illinois, through mail order sales. It was also sold at Highland Appliance in the Detroit area, Newman Computer Exchange in Ann Arbor, and Montgomery Ward in the Houston, Texas, area.

The computer didn't come with any operating system, but Microsoft BASIC V4.7 or EDU-BASIC (supplied with the computer) could be loaded from tape.

Probably the most successful application available for the Interact was a program called "Message Center". With it, a store could program a scrolling message which appeared on a TV screen (such as advertisements, or a welcome message to guests).

Although it was mostly a game machine (with games such as Showdown, Blackjack and Chess), users could also create their own programs using the BASIC computer language. Customers began hooking up the Interact to control everything from lights in their house, doors, windows, smoke detectors, to a Chevrolet Corvette.

Later on the design was sold to a French company, Lambda Systems, and re-branded as the "Victor Lambda" for the French market.

== Technical specifications ==
- CPU: Intel i8080, 2.0 MHz
- Memory: 8K RAM, expandable to 16K or 32K RAM
- ROM: 2K ROM plus one empty socket for an additional 2K ROM
- Keyboard: 53-key chiclet
- Display: 17 x 12 text; eight colors, 112 x 78 graphics, four colors
- Sound: SN76477 (One voice, four octaves)
- Ports: Television, two joysticks
- Built-in cassette recorder (1200 Bps)
- PSU: External AC transformer
- 1980 price: US$300 (equivalent to $1,200 in 2025)

== Software ==
There are 20 known games for the Interact Home Computer

Name	Publisher	Year
Add ’Em Up	Interact Electronics	unknown
Backgammon	Interact Electronics	1978
Blackjack	Interact Electronics	1978
Breakthrough	Interact Electronics	1978
Compute-A-Color	Interact Electronics	unknown
Computer Maze	Interact Electronics	unknown
Concentration	Interact Electronics	1978
Dogfight	Interact Electronics	1978
Earth Outpost I	Micro Video	1980
Hangman	Interact Electronics	unknown
Knockdown	Interact Electronics	1978
Microchess	Interact Electronics	unknown
Regatta	Interact Electronics	1978
Reversi	Interact Electronics	unknown
Showdown	Interact Electronics	1978
Star Track	Interact Electronics	unknown
Touchdown	Micro Video	unknown
Trailblazers	Interact Electronics	1978
Video Chess	Interact Electronics	unknown
Volleyball	Interact Electronics	1979
