= Jupiter Ace =

British home computer of the early 1980s

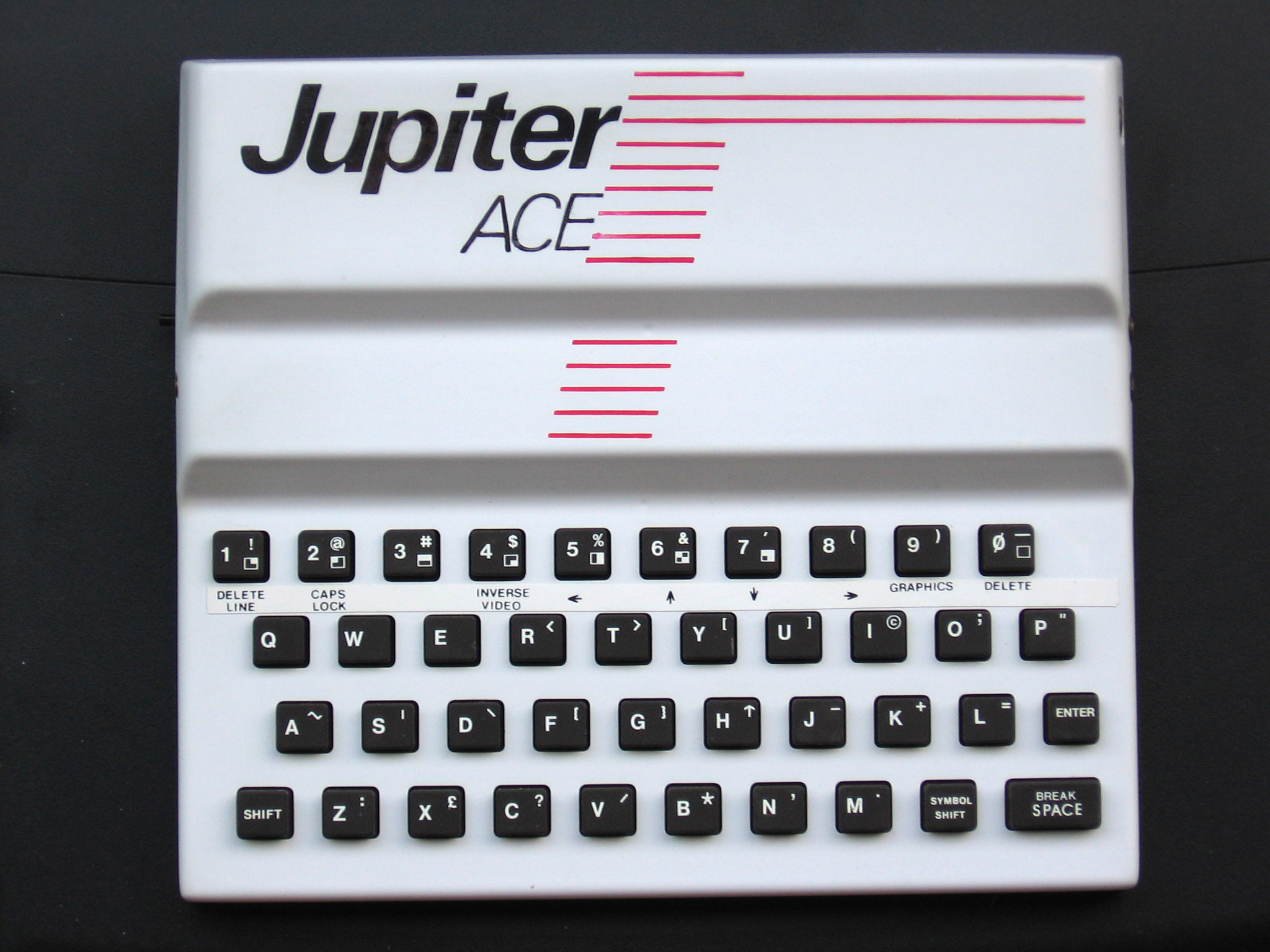
- Developer: Jupiter Cantab
- Type: Home computer
- Released: 22 September 1982; 44 years ago
- Introductory price: £89.95 (equivalent to £320 in 2025)
- Discontinued: 1984; 42 years ago
- Units sold: around 5,000 units
- Operating system: ACE Forth
- CPU: Z80 @ 3.25 MHz
- Memory: 3 KB (maximum 49 KB)
- Removable storage: Cassette-tape interface (1500 baud)
- Display: 32 × 24 monochrome characters, 127 redefinable 8 × 8 pixel characters, semigraphics
- Sound: Beeper

The Jupiter Ace was a British home computer by Jupiter Cantab, released in 1982. Like many other home computers of the era, it utilized the Zilog Z80 microprocessor. Known for its distinct white case and visual similarity to the ZX Spectrum, the Ace differed from other microcomputers of the time in that its programming environment used Forth instead of the more popular BASIC. This difference, along with a small selection of commercially available games and software, rudimentary sound generation through an internal speaker, and a comparatively poor character based graphic display limited sales; the machine was not a success in the market.

== History ==
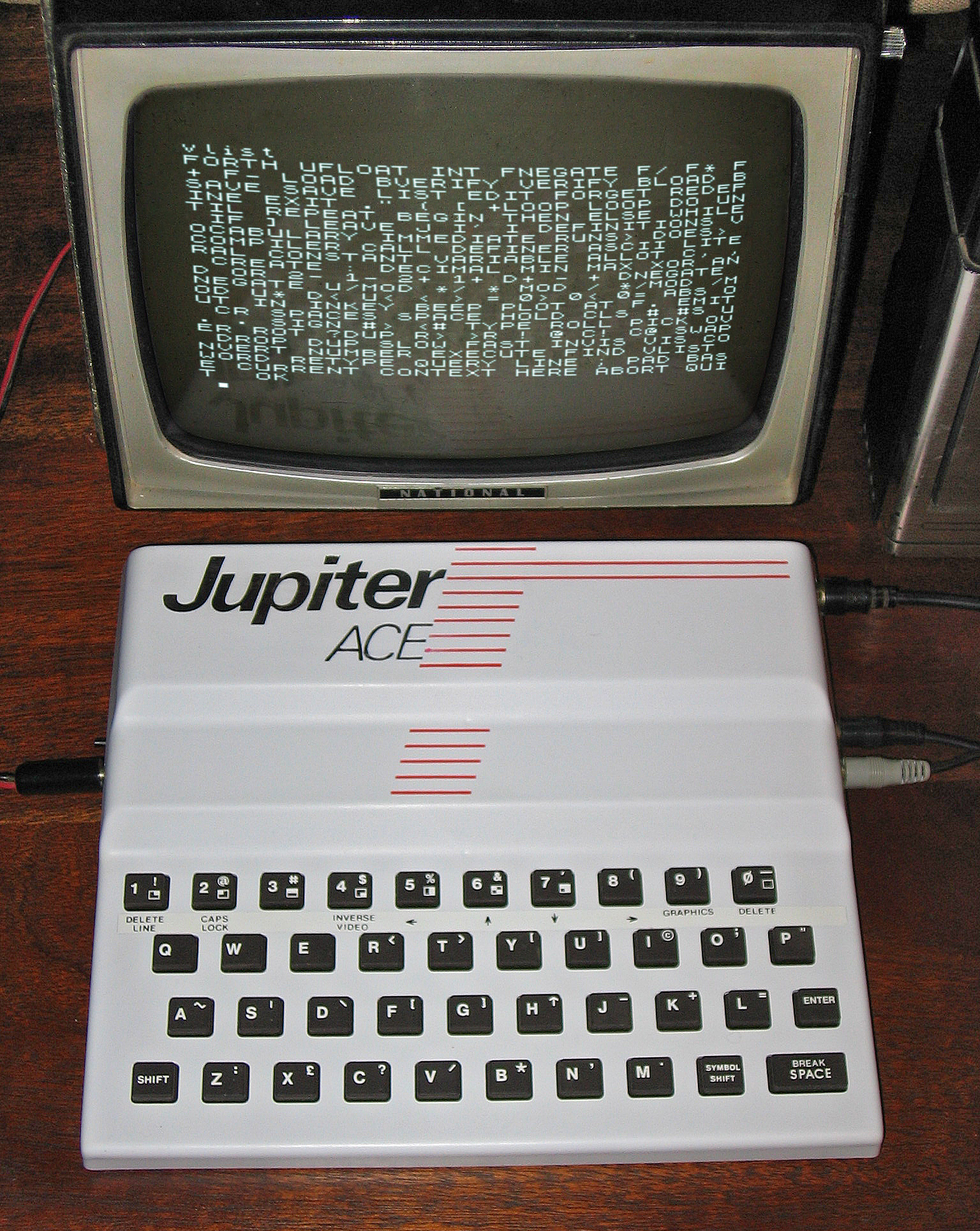
A small Jupiter Ace system

Jupiter Cantab was formed by Richard Altwasser and Steven Vickers. Both had been on the design team for the ZX Spectrum: Altwasser worked on ZX81 development and hardware design of the Spectrum. Vickers adapted and expanded the 4K ZX80 ROM to the 8K ZX81 ROM and wrote most of the ROM for the Spectrum.

The Jupiter Ace was named after an early British computer from 1950: the Pilot ACE. The Jupiter Ace went on sale on 22 September 1982 with a price of £89.95.

Sales to the general public were slow. Initially the computer was only available by mail order, and Jupiter Cantab reported that there were production difficulties, but these had been overcome by January 1983 and that units were arriving in shops.

The use of Forth rather than the more usual choice of BASIC, and the availability and success of the ZX Spectrum, as well as limited published software, the poor case and small initial memory all weighed against wider market acceptance. Eventually Jupiter Cantab ceased trading by the end of October 1983.

The brand was then acquired by Boldfield Computing Ltd in 1984 that sold the remaining stock by mail order for £26. The brand was again sold to Paul Andrews's company Andrews UK Limited in 2015.

=== Sales ===
Sales of the machine were never very large; the reported number of Aces sold before Jupiter Cantab closed for business was around 5,000. As of the early 2000s, surviving machines are uncommon, often fetching high prices as collector's items.

Forth, while being structured and powerful, was considered difficult to learn, and a knowledge of BASIC acquired from familiarity with other home computers was of no practical help in learning it. A 1982 review stated that "The success of the Jupiter Ace will depend on the machine-buying public's acceptance of another microcomputer language."

Further, there was only a very limited range of published software – either commercial programs or type-in programs printed in hobby magazines – for the machine, and these were restricted by the base model's small amount of RAM.

Attempts to promote the Ace in the educational market also failed; doubts over whether Forth would be relevant for exam syllabuses, and the lack of support for Forth from teaching staff were key issues. Pupils were more interested in learning the widely used BASIC than a language used by only one (uncommon) machine with a peculiar Reverse Polish notation syntax.

Finally, the tile-based graphics compared poorly to the pixel-based graphics of other machines – which were also colour rather than the Ace's monochrome. This restricted sales largely to a niche market of technical programming enthusiasts.

== Design ==
The Jupiter Ace is often compared with ZX81 due to its similar size, low cost, and similar form factor. Internally its design is more similar to the ZX Spectrum although the Ace also had a dedicated video memory of 2 KB, partly avoiding the slow down when programs accessed the same bank (same chips) as the video memory. Like the Spectrum, the Ace used rubber keys although unlike the Spectrum, the keys had a conductive pad that was squashed directly onto tracks on the PCB rather than using a membrane. As a result, the keys would often stop working reliably until they were cleaned or the conductive material was refreshed.

Audio capabilities were CPU-controlled with programmable frequency and duration. Sound output was through a small built-in speaker.

As was common at the time, it used a common tape recorder instead of disk/tape drives. Similarly, a television was needed as a display – but this was in black and white only, rather than the colour supported by competing models such as the Spectrum. A secondary (undocumented) edge connector on the back of the case made some video signals available, presumably for a forthcoming colour video card, but no official product that used this connector was ever released.

The Jupiter Ace was based on the Zilog Z80, which the designers had previous experience of from working on the Sinclair ZX81 and ZX Spectrum.

Both graphics and text could be displayed at the same time: (1) redefinition of the character tiles provided standard 256×192 graphics limited to the 128 available (definable) 8×8 chars, concurrent with plotting of 64×48 graphics.

Internal speaker directly controlled by the CPU in single task mode, with control of sound frequency and duration in milliseconds.

Storage was through a cassette-tape interface at 1500 baud. Files could be used for either storage of Forth programs (compiled code) or raw dumps of memory.

=== Memory ===
The Ace had an 8 KB ROM containing the Forth kernel and operating system, and the predefined dictionary of Forth words in about 5 KB. The remaining 3 KB of ROM supported several functionalities: floating-point numbers library and character definitions table, tape recorder access, decompiling and redefining newly re-edited 'words' (i.e. routines). Some of the ROM was written in Z80 machine code, but some was also coded in Forth.

The next 8 KB was built in RAM that was only partially decoded, with 2 KB of video RAM echoed twice, and 1 KB of user RAM echoed 4 times (with the same memory appearing at several different memory addresses).

Using the lower-address mirror of the video RAM would select CPU priority, resulting in some momentary random pixels on the screen when video subsystem and the CPU accessed the video RAM in the same clock cycle. Using the higher-address would briefly pause the CPU on the interference, affecting the program timing and making this mode unsuitable for I/O operations. Since video RAM was partially separated from the main address and data busses, for the most part the video subsystem and the CPU could operate in parallel.

The first 16 KB of the memory map was used for ROM, Video and User-available RAM, leaving the second 16 KB of the memory map free for RAM extension and the topmost 32 KB undefined.

One 1K bank allowed redefinition of most of its 128 ASCII-based characters in 8×8 pixel bitmap format. The other 1K bank stored the full screen display of 24 rows × 32 columns of characters in black and white. Colour was intended to be achieved as expansion, but although a colour-graphics board was designed, none was ever produced commercially.

1 KB RAM with the option of a 16 KB RAM-Pack, and later a 32 KB one. A PCB was also marketed by Boldfield Computing that converted the edge connector to electrical compatibility with a Sinclair ZX81, allowing use of the ZX81 16K RAM pack.

=== Specifications ===
Characteristic	Value
Processor	Zilog Z80A clocked at 3.25 MHz.
Operating system	FORTH (as both the programming language and command-line interface).
Memory	2 KB for Video + 1 KB base expandable up to 49 KB (video excluded).
Video	Independent sub-system with 2 dedicated SRAM banks: Screen (1 KB) + Char Tiles (1 KB).
Sound	Internal speaker, CPU-driven (non-dedicated).
Expansion	2 connectors: Main (CPU related) + Video (screen + AV signal).
Keyboard and Charset	40-key QWERTY keyboard (symbols access with extra key). All chars in Charset (based on ASCII-1967) being redefinable.
Character set	Based on ASCII-1967 with extensions as for the ZX Spectrum character set including ↑, £ and ©.

References to the Ace RAM sometimes include the separate 2 KB video memory, which was not available for programming, thus leading to some confusion. Similarly, it is sometimes argued that because of Forth's efficiency, the 1 KB standard RAM was in effect comparable to at least 2 KB on a BASIC system.

== Programming ==
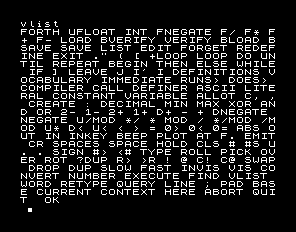
Ace's Forth vocabulary

Its most distinctive characteristic was the choice of Forth, a structured language. Threaded compilation allowed programs written to run nearly as fast as many native-compiled languages loaded by more expensive computers. Forth was considered well-adapted to microcomputers with their small memory and relatively low-performance processors. Forth programs are memory-efficient; as they become bigger, they reuse more previously defined code. Control structures could be nested to any level, limited only by available memory. This allowed complex programs to be implemented, even allowing recursive programming. The Ace's Forth was stated to be "ten times faster than Basic" and used less than half the memory (a significant cost percentage of low end computers of the time) of an equivalent program written in interpreted BASIC. It also allowed easy implementation of machine code routines if needed.

Ace's Forth was based mostly on Forth-79, with some relevant differences, in particular it added syntax checking to control structures and definer constructions and a few extra words were added based on common BASIC sound, video and tape commands. The implementation lacked some less frequently used Forth words, these being easily implemented if needed. Runtime error checking could be turned off to raise speed by 25% to 50%.

=== Decompiling ===
Its Forth was adapted to the disk-less tape-using home computer hardware by being able to save/load user "compiled vocabularies", instead of the usual numbered programming blocks used by diskette systems.

Decompiling avoided wasting RAM in simulating an absent Block System, used with both disk and tape drivers (these last not to be confused with tape recorders). As replacement, it included an extra data file, for raw binary data. These solutions were unique to the Jupiter Ace.

=== DEFINER vs COMPILER ===
To allow decompile, it distinguished usual Forth definer and compiler words creation, replacing the CREATE .. DOES>, creation pair with:

1. DEFINER .... DOES> : Create new Defining words, usually used to define and build data structures. Similar to CREATE..DOES usage in standard FORTH. (Example: adding data structures such as arrays or records.)
2. COMPILER .. RUNS> : Create new Compiling words, less frequently used to extend the language with compiler words where CREATE..DOES> is FORTH implementation dependent. (Example: new compiler control structures such as Case or Infinite Loop.)

These two defining pairs, instead of one alone, allowed the Ace to decompile its programs, unlike usual Forth systems. This decompiling ability was a solution to the absence of the more flexible disk system used by Forth. Not storing the source of a Forth program, but compiling the code after editing, it avoided completely the emulation of a disk/tape drive on RAM saving computer memory. It also saved time in reading and writing programs from cassette tape. This tape-friendly and RAM-saving solution was unique to the Jupiter Ace Forth.

The names can be equivocal out of a Forth context, as all Words are compiled when declared. DEFINER defines a new Class (as an array) that will build (compile) an array Object. These are active on 'Interpreter'. Pairing this Interaction mode, COMPILER defines a programming structure (usually a pair or a triplet) as IF-ELSE-THEN. These 'Structured Programming' are active on 'Compile' mode (which is simply building a new Forth Word). In short, "Interpreting mode" means Run stage, while "Compiling mode" refers to an Editing stage.

=== Development ===
Avoiding sources was compensated by storing comments entered in the code with the compiled output, traditional compilation would discard such comments. The comments were then recovered on decompiling. As a result of "code is the source", modified words (edited) would demand actualization of all code using the one newly edited. This was done with the non standard REDEFINE command.

Although not explicitly designed for such a purpose, the compiled Forth could be utilised for ROM extensions to the built in system. External ROMs were developed with Ace Forth to be used as control applications.

== Add-ons ==
The machine was able to use some ZX81 add-ons due to similar RAM locations, and external expansion slot. Jupiter Cantab made a 16 KB RAM pack, and external companies made similar RAM packs as well as other peripherals and interfaces.

RAM packs
1. 16 KB by Jupiter Cantab.
2. 16 KB and 32 KB by Stonechip Electronics.
3. 16 KB by Sinclair, with adaptor board from Jupiter Cantab for electrical compatibility.
4. 48 KB by Boldfield (new Jupiter Ace owner after Jupiter Cantab).
Keyboard
- Memotech Keyboard, by Memotech.
Sound
- SoundBoard (1983) by Essex Micro Electronics,
Storage
1. Jet-Disc Disc Drive System (1983) by MPE (control up to four 3", 5", or 8" drives).
2. "Deep Thought" Disc interface with a 4K AceDOS in an EPROM (1986) by J Shepherd & S Leask.
Printer Adapters
- ADS Centronics Interface Machine (1983), by Advanced Digital Systems,
- RS232 & Centronics PrinterCard (1984) by Essex Micro Electronics.
- It was possible to connect the Sinclair ZX Printer via an adaptor board and software.

Graphics Card
1. Gray Scale card – 4 shades of gray by S Leask (1986)

== Models ==
=== Jupiter Ace issue 1 ===
The original Jupiter Ace issue 1 was introduced in 1982, and came in a vacuum-drawn case. Reportedly 5000 units were produced.

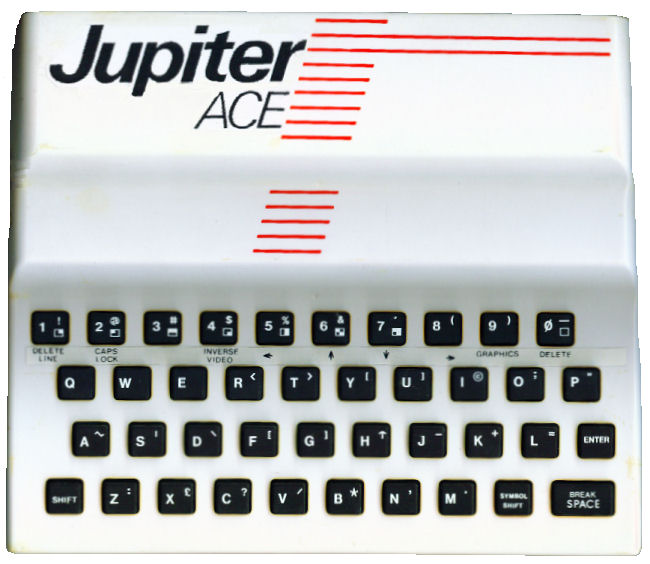
Jupiter Ace issue 1

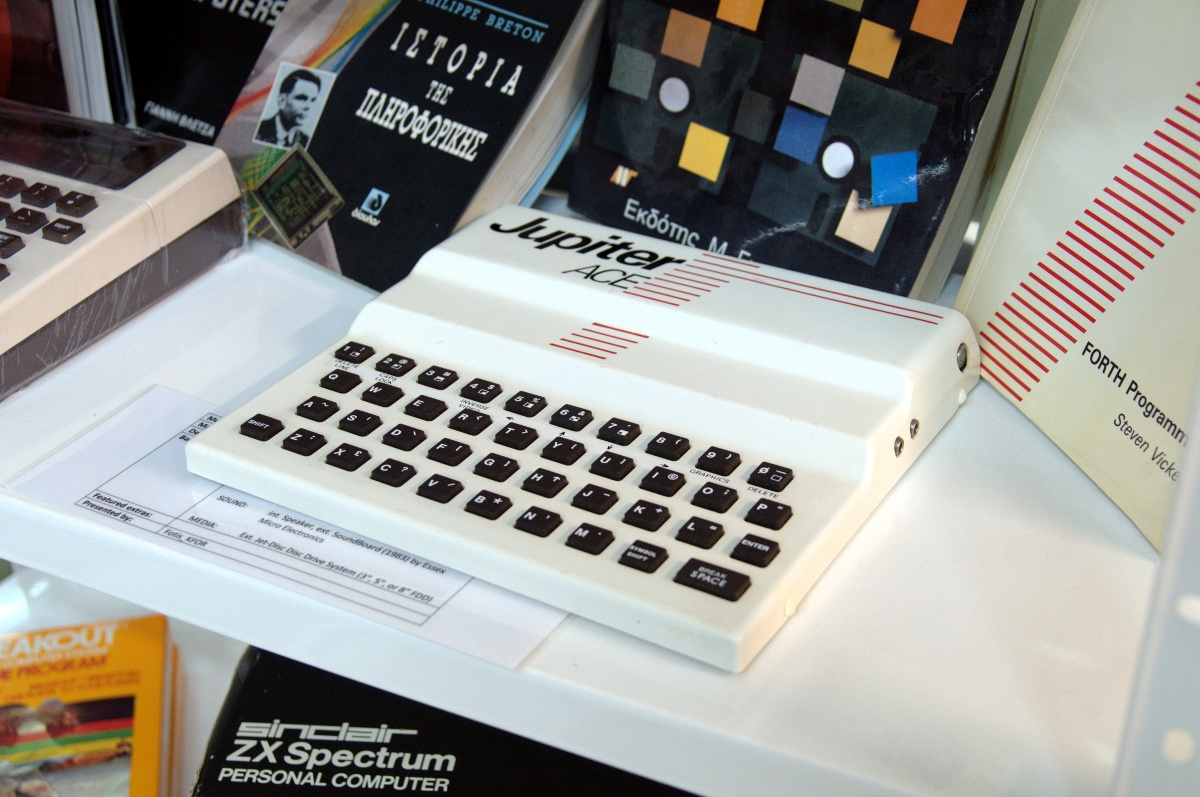
Jupiter Ace issue 1

=== Jupiter Ace 4000 ===
The Jupiter Ace 4000 was introduced in 1983, and came with a stronger injection-moulded case. Reportedly 800 units were produced.

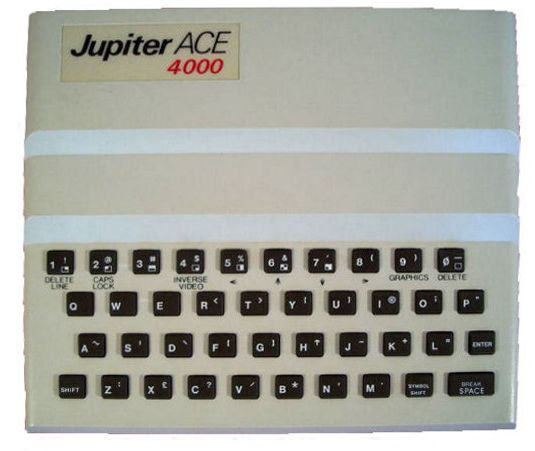
Jupiter Ace 4000

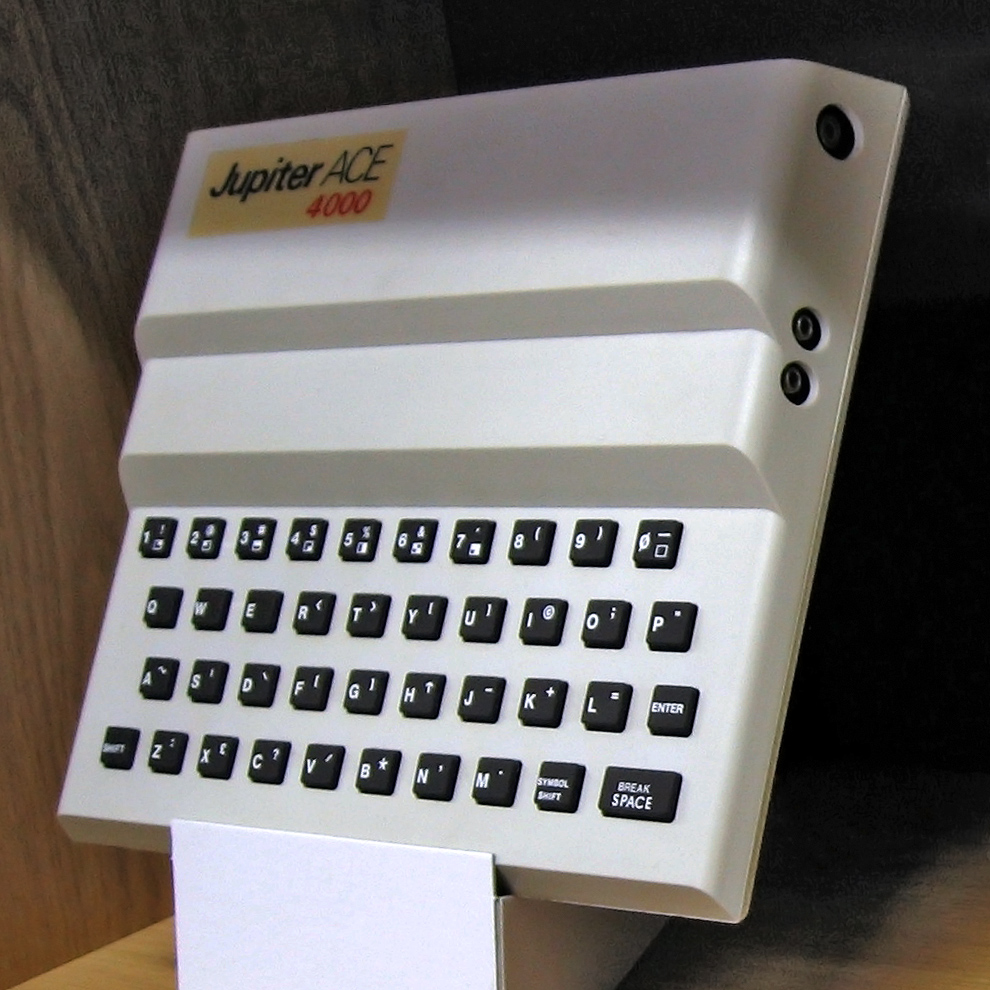
Jupiter Ace 4000

== Video games ==
The following tables list known Jupiter Ace games, excluding unreleased games. Releases from established commercial companies are listed separately from games issued by individuals, user, clubs and independent software labels.

There are 29 games on this list.

=== Commercial games ===
Title	Publisher	Release year
Ace Invasion	Titan Programs Ltd (UK)	1983
Acevaders	Micro Marketing (UK)	1983
Alien Defender	Boldfield Computing Ltd	1984
Amazing Maze	Boldfield Computing Ltd	1984
Atic Raid	Boldfield Computing Ltd	1984
Black Island Adventure	Boldfield Computing Ltd	1984
Blackjack	JRS Software Ltd (UK)	1983
Centipede	Boldfield Computing Ltd	1984
Champ de Mines / Casse Briques	ERE Informatique (France)	1983
Chess	Boldfield Computing Ltd	1983
Cygnus	Boldfield Computing Ltd	1984
Dot Man (Sushiro)	Micro Marketing (UK)	1983
Duckshoot / Minefield / Zapem	Micro Marketing (UK)	1983
Fish / Flutterer	Jupiter Cantab (UK)	1983
Frogger	Boldfield Computing Ltd	1984
Galactic Invasion	JRS Software Ltd (UK)	1983
Gobbledegook	Jupiter Cantab (UK)	1983
Greedy Gobbler / Blowing Up the World	Jupiter Cantab (UK)	1983
Missile Man / Space Fighter Pilot	Jupiter Cantab (UK)	1983
Moo / Hangman	Jupiter Cantab (UK)	1983
Othello	Jupiter Cantab (UK)	1983
Overtaker / Brands Hatch	Jupiter Cantab (UK)	1983
Puzzle / Bombs	Boldfield Computing Ltd	1984
Subs	JRS Software Ltd (UK)	1983
SuperChess II	CP Software	1983
Swamp Monsters	Micro Marketing (UK)	1983
Triple Pack 1: Balloon Pilot / Shuttlecock	Boldfield Computing Ltd	1983
TV Jupiter Says	Micro Marketing Ltd	1983
Zombies and Potholes	Jupiter Cantab (UK)	1983

There are 79 games on this list.

=== Hobbyist and indie games ===
Title	Publisher	Release year
Ace Invaders (Forth Dimension)	Forth Dimension	1983
Ace Invaders (Hi-Tech Microsoft)	Hi-Tech Microsoft	1983
Ace Pack 1 (Insect Catcher, Surround, Grand Prix)	Dream Software	1983
Ace Pack 2 (Defence, Sketch, Racer, Code Breaker)	Dream Software	1983
Ace Pack 3 (Picman, Breakout, Life)	Dream Software	1983
ACE Snake	Stusoft	1984
Asteroids (AMR-Soft)	AMR-Soft	1983
Asteroids (Hamsoft)	Hamsoft	1983
Atomic Sub	T. M. Phizackerley	1983
Bouncing Bill	D. Leonard	1983
Breakout	Hamsoft	1983
Cave Dive	Softspot	1984
Cavern Attack	Hi-Tech Microsoft	1982
City Bomber	Softspot	1984
Cosmic Meteors	Hi-Tech Microsoft	1983
Defender	Softspot	1984
Earth Defence	Hamsoft	1983
Elusive Recluse / Acesnake	Stusoft	1984
Empire Invasion	Hi-Tech Microsoft	1982
Fire Fox	Softspot	1983
Firebird	Voyager Software	1983
Frogger (AMR-Soft)	AMR-Soft	1983
Frogger (R. Roberts)	R. Roberts	1983
Games Tape One (Federation Software)	Federation Software	1983
Games Tape One (Brick Catcher, Asteroids, Street Racer, TimeVaders)	Voyager Software	1983
Games Tape Two	Voyager Software	1983
Games Tape Three (Bomber, Jackpot)	Voyager Software	1983
Ganymede	ACS Software	1983
Green X Frog	Hi-Tech Microsoft	1983
Haunted House	Dream Software	1983
Hawkeye	Federation Software	1983
High Voltage	P. Cousins	1983
Hopper	Discount Software	1983
Invaders (AMR-Soft)	AMR-Soft	1983
Invaders (T. M. Phizackerley)	T. M. Phizackerley	1983
JA1 Tape	R. Roberts	1983
JA3 (Lair of the Dragon Lord)	R. Roberts	1983
Jovian Game Tape 1 (Aceteroids, Demolition, Moneymatrix, Golfgrid, Duckinvaders)	Jovian Games	1983
Jumpman	Callisto Software	1984
Krazy Kong	J. Jones	1983
Life	Hamsoft	1983
Life on Jupiter	Hi-Tech Microsoft	1983
Light Cycles	Softspot	1983
Maceman	Voyager Software	1983
Mastermind	Hamsoft	1983
Mazeman	P. Cousins	1983
Memory Stars	Hi-Tech Microsoft	1983
Meteor Racer	Forth Dimension	1983
Meteor Storm	D. Leonard	1983
Micro Maze	Hi-Tech Microsoft	1983
Millepede	Softspot	1983
Owler	Callisto Software	1983
Pakman	AMR-Soft	1983
Racer	Hamsoft	1983
Remsoft Tape 2: Night Rider / Sketch / Editor	Remsoft	1983
Remsoft Tape 3: Appleater / Parachute / Meteor Cruise	Remsoft	1983
Remsoft Tape 4: Saucer / Driver / Maze / Para	Remsoft	1983
Remsoft Tape 5: Frogger	Remsoft	1983
Remsoft Tape 9: Bomber / Gorger / Bouncy	Remsoft	1983
Remsoft Tape 12: Frogger / Scramble / Meteor / Breakout / Star Wars	Remsoft	1983
Remsoft Tape 15: Aliens	Remsoft	1983
Remsoft Tape 16: Graphic Golf	Remsoft	1983
Reversi	R. Roberts	1984
Road Toad	D. Leonard	1983
Shell Shock	D. Leonard	1983
Ski-Run	AMR-Soft	1983
Snake / Superbat	Waylandsoft	1985
Space Battle	Hi-Tech Microsoft	1983
Space Patrol	Forth Dimension	1983
Space Raiders	Hi-Tech Microsoft	1983
Spacehop	Federation Software	1983
Spider Attack	A. Sova	1983
Star Trek Mission	RavenSoft	1983
Super Toad	I. McWilliams	1983
Tank	A. Curtis	1983
Ten All-Time Greats for Your Jupiter Ace	J. Nicholson	1983
Ten Pin Bowling	K. Longley	1983
Titan Defender / Dual Duel	Stusoft	1985
Worm	A. Curtis	1983

== See also ==
Other Forth-based microcomputers:

- Hector HRX
- Canon Cat
