= Richard J. Daly =

American business executive

- Education: New York Institute Of Technology
- Employer: Chief Executive Officer of Broadridge Financial Solutions
- Awards: 2003: Ernst & Young Entrepreneur of the Year Award
- Website: Official website at ADT

Richard J. Daly is an American business executive. He was the president and chief executive officer of Broadridge Financial Solutions, a multibillion-dollar company. In 2003, he won the Ernst & Young Entrepreneur of the Year Award.

== Early life and education ==
Richard J. Daly earned a Bachelor of Science degree in Accounting from New York Institute Of Technology. He also completed Harvard Business School’s Young President’s Program.

== Career ==
Daly has been a member of Broadridge Financial Solutions's board and its chief executive officer since 2007. He formerly served as the president of Automatic Data Processing, another multibillion-dollar company.

He is a member of the board of trustees of New York Institute of Technology. He is a founding member of the board of directors of the Make-A-Wish Foundation of Suffolk County, Inc. and currently serves as an Honorary Director. Daly is also a member of the board of directors for The ADT Corporation.

Daly relinquished his position as the Broadridge Financial Solutions president in 2017 and retired as CEO in 2019. He now serves as executive board chairman.
