= Altwasser =

Altwasser may refer to:

- Richard Altwasser (born 1957), British engineer and inventor
- Stary Zdrój (German: Altwasser), a town of Poland
