= Support.com =

Tech support company

- Formerly: Support.com, Inc.
- Type: Division
- Industry: Services, Tech Support, Help Desk, Online tech support
- Founded: 1997
- Founders: Mark Pincus, Scott Dale, Cadir Lee
- Defunct: 2023 (merged into RealDefense)
- Fate: Acquired by RealDefense
- Headquarters: Wilmington, Delaware; Sunnyvale, California, USA
- Products: TechSolutions, Nexus/Cloud, RightHandIT
- Owner: RealDefense (2023-present); Greenridge Generation Holdings (2021-2023)
- Website: www.support.com

Support.com is a technical support service for businesses and consumers offered by RealDefense LLC. As Support.com, Inc., it was headquartered in Wilmington, Delaware with an administrative office in Sunnyvale, California. The services are performed on Windows, macOS, iOS, and Android, supporting connected and smart devices. These services are performed by a remote, full-time workforce based mainly in the U.S.

Support.com also owns RightHand IT, headquartered in Louisville, Colorado, which provides managed IT services for small businesses.

== History ==
In September 1997, Mark Pincus, Scott Dale, and Cadir Lee launched Replicase Inc., a software company in Redwood City, California. SoftBank invested $2.5 million in the company.

In October 1998, Replicase was renamed Tioga Systems, Inc., coinciding with the relocation of the corporate headquarters to Palo Alto, California. The company's focus moved to self-healing software, the idea that Windows applications could automatically fix any problems they encountered.

In August 1999, Radha Basu, coming from Hewlett-Packard, was appointed president and CEO, with Pincus moving to chairman.

In December 1999, the company changed its corporate name to Support.com, then headquartered in Redwood City. Its focus shifted to providing support software for enterprise companies.

The company went public with an IPO on July 19, 2000, backed by Credit Suisse First Boston.

On March 28, 2002, Support.com was renamed SupportSoft, Inc. On June 23, 2009, the enterprise technology of SupportSoft was acquired by Consona Corporation, and the company name was changed back to Support.com. Support.com acquired Core Networks in 2004; YourTechOnline in 2008; and Sammsoft in 2009. In 2011, the company acquired SUPERAntiSpyware. In 2012, the company acquired RightHand IT.

In April 2006, Basu stepped down, and Josh Pickus was named CEO, coming from CA Technologies. On April 1, 2014, Pickus resigned from his position as president and CEO. In May 2014, Elizabeth Cholawsky, formerly of Citrix Systems, was announced as Support.com's new CEO. In October 2016, Richard Bloom was appointed interim president and CEO, with the interim tag later being removed. On August 10, 2020, Support.com announced that Lance Rosenzweig would succeed Bloom as president and CEO.

On September 15, 2021, cryptocurrency mining and power generation company Greenridge Generation Holdings acquired Support.com in a reverse takeover.

In January 2023, SuperAntiSpyware was sold to RealDefense SE. In July 2023, Greenidge Generation Holdings sold Support.com to RealDefense LLC.

== Products and services ==
- TechSolutions - direct-to-consumer tech support for connected devices with help from live tech support agents via phone, chat, or virtual house calls; includes Support.com Guided Paths, free self-support tools
- Virtual call center services and remote IT Help desk support - outsourced technical support services including remote call center operations and software platform to enable remote call center teams
- Nexus - cloud-based software for support interaction optimization
- Small business tech support services - RightHand IT and remote tech support for small business

In October 2013, Support.com announced the latest version of its Nexus Service Delivery Platform, which included expanded service for mobile devices and real-time analytics. ts TechSolutions consumer tech support was announced in October 2019.

== Customers and partnerships ==
The company's customers have included Zendesk, Upclick, SiOnyx, Cox Communications and Comcast. The company has entered into partnerships with companies including InstallerNet, Office Depot, AOL, Staples, Sony, OnForce, and Absolute Software Corporation. The company also launched a partnership with Target to provide tech support for Target's MyTGTtech solution.

== Litigation ==
On February 27, 2012, a class action lawsuit was filed against Support.com and AOL, claiming that their Computer Checkup software would offer to perform a free scan, purposely find problems that did not actually exist and then offer to sell software to remedy those problems. Both AOL and Support.com settled the claim on May 30, 2013, by offering a refund to consumers up to a total amount of $8.5 million.

In December 2016, a complaint was filed against Support.com and Office Depot alleging their free PC Health Check Program used by Office Depot purposely misidentified malware symptoms, and that consumers were then encouraged to purchase repair services. In March 2019, Office Depot agreed to pay $25 million and Support.com agreed to pay $10 million to settle the complaint. Support.com suspended use of the PC Health Check Program in 2016.
