= FDX =

FDX may refer to:

- FedEx Corporation, original FDX Corporation, American logistics services company
- FedEx Express, the ICAO code FDX, American cargo airline

Computing:

- FDX, an expansion pack for the 1980s Memotech MTX computer
- .fdx, the filename extension for Final Draft files
- Fetch-decode-execute cycle, or FDX, basic operation cycle of a computer

Telecommunications:

- Full-duplex, communication circuit
