= Texas Instruments SN76477 =

Sound generating integrated circuit

SN76477
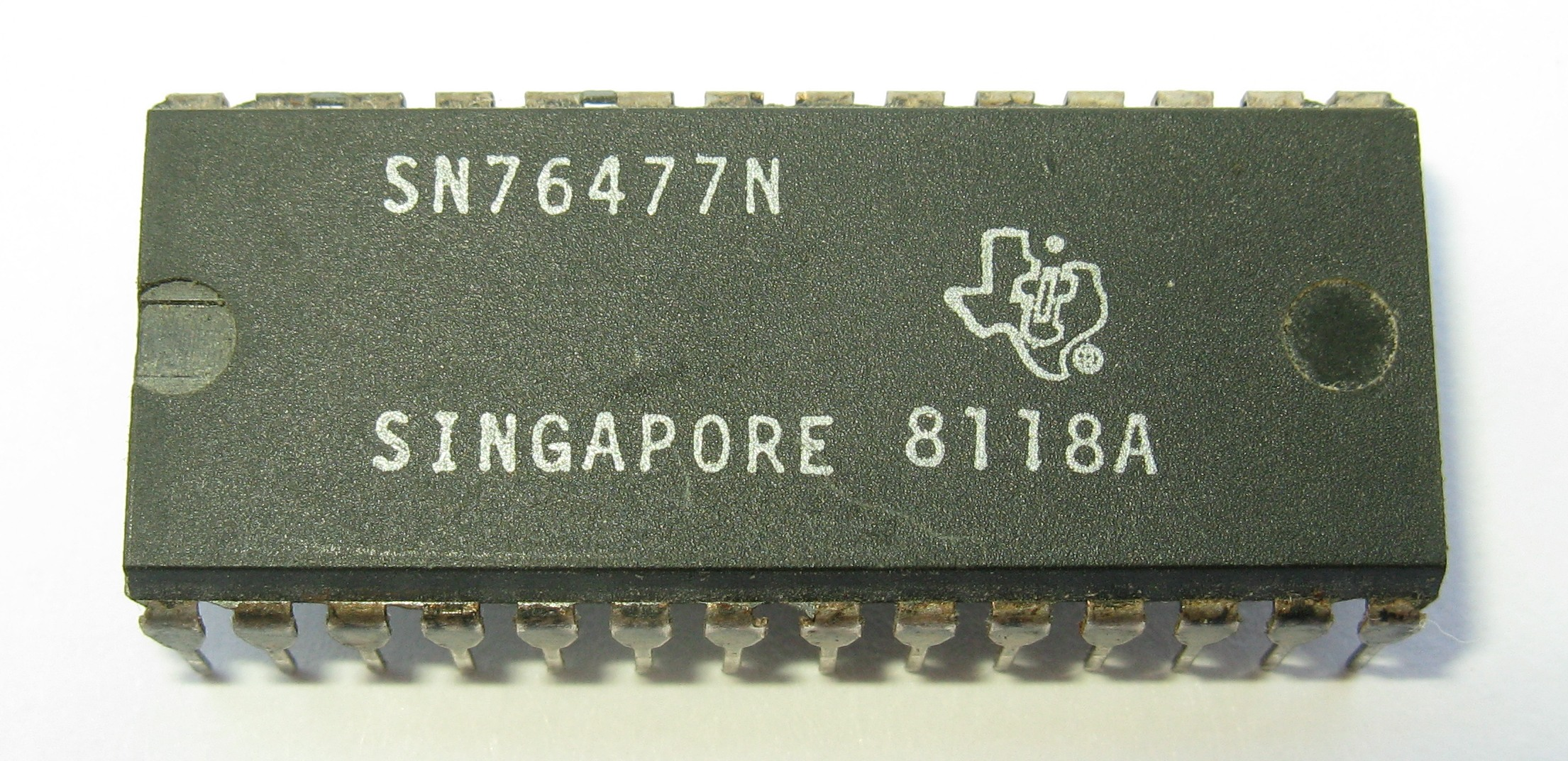
- SN76477 in a 28-pin DIP package
- Component type: sound chip
- First produced: 1978

SN76477 "complex sound generator" is a sound chip produced by Texas Instruments (TI). The chip came to market in 1978. A compatible version is identified as ICS76477.

The SN76477 was essentially a synthesizer on a chip, and was intended to be used with external controls like potentiometers and keyboards that would control the output. Many of its advanced features like envelope control required external circuity to implement. Moreover, the internal model was based on the concept of one-shot sounds, in which a particular tone would be generated once for a specified time when triggered by an external signal, like a keypress.

The chip was used as a sound effects generator in arcade games and toys and for hobby projects. Among its better-known uses is the arcade game Space Invaders. More recently, it has been used as a hobbyist system for building simple analog synthesizers, using it with various external controllers.

In 1979, TI released the Texas Instruments SN76489, which had fewer features but was much easier to integrate into systems, and saw considerably wider use in the market.

== Overview ==
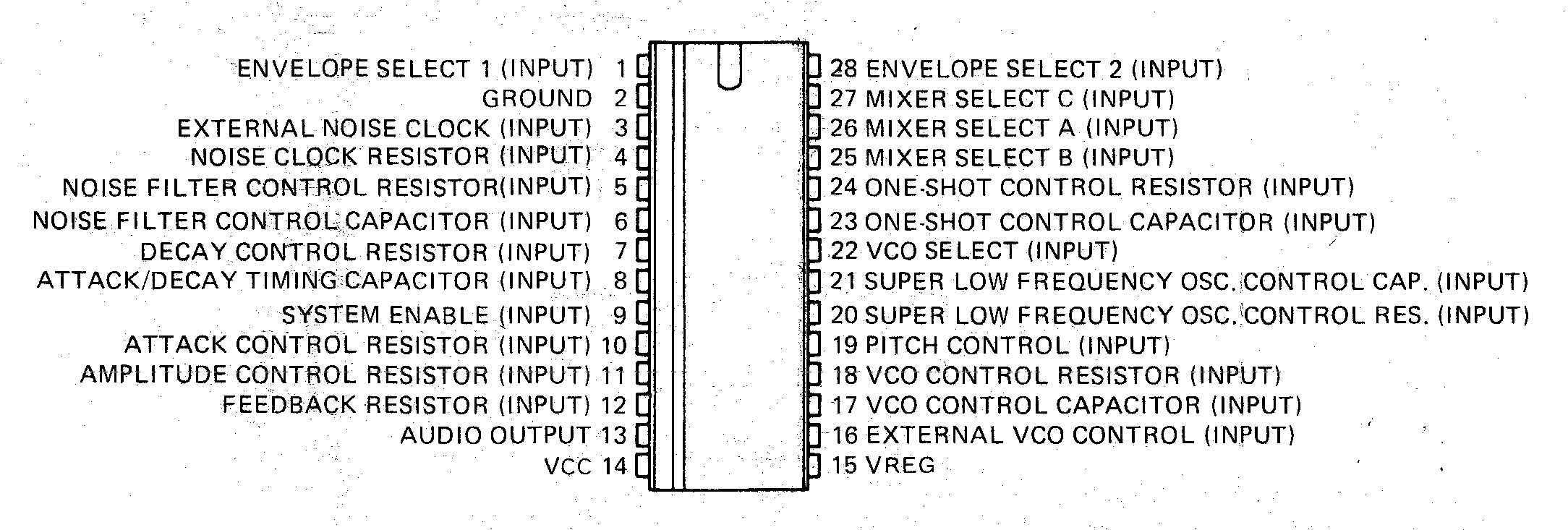
SN76477 top view

The SN76477 was an advanced design for its era, including three voltage-controlled oscillator (VCO) tone generators (or "voices") that can be played at the same time to produce three-note polyphony. It also had a "super low frequency" oscillator (SLF) designed to be a control source that would be used to control the output of the three main voices, for instance, by turning a selected VCO output on and off at a given rate. A similar circuit added noise that can be mixed into the other voices, or gated by the SLF to produce its own percussion-like sounds. Additionally, the system included an envelope generator with controls for the attack and decay times, as well as the sustain level. The output of any of the channels was further controlled by an on/off switch, or a separate "one shot" switch that would play a given channel for a pre-specified time and then stop.

The combination of these features made it among the more advanced sound chips of its era, with only the General Instrument AY-3-8910 offering some level of parity, although it lacked the SLF and the effects it could create. However, the SN76477 lacked any internal state, and all of the control inputs had to be provided through external circuity connected to various pins, whereas most sound chips included internal processor registers that controlled internal circuitry to provided these controls. This made the SN76477 significantly more difficult to implement; for instance, using the envelope generator required connecting three pins to resistors to provide reference levels for the attack, decay and sustain levels, and a capacitor to control the timing of the attack and decay. Even selecting the pitch for one of the VCOs required external circuits.

There were two different sizes of the SN76477 available. The SN76477N was in a standard 0.6 in (15.24 mm) width dual in-line package (DIP). The SN76477NF was in a less common 0.4 inch (10.16 mm) width DIP. The SN76488 is similar to the SN76477 but with internal audio amplifier.

The following quotation summarizes its facilities:

[T]he SN76477 generates complex audio signal waveforms by combining the outputs of a low frequency oscillator, variable frequency (voltage-controlled) oscillator (VCO) and noise source, modulating the resulting composite signal with a selected envelope and, finally, adjusting the signal's attack and decay periods. At each stage, the process can be controlled at the programming inputs of the signal modification and generation circuits, using control voltages, logic levels, or different resistor and capacitor values.

— Lou Garner, Solid State, Popular Electronics magazine, October 1978.

== Sample circuit ==
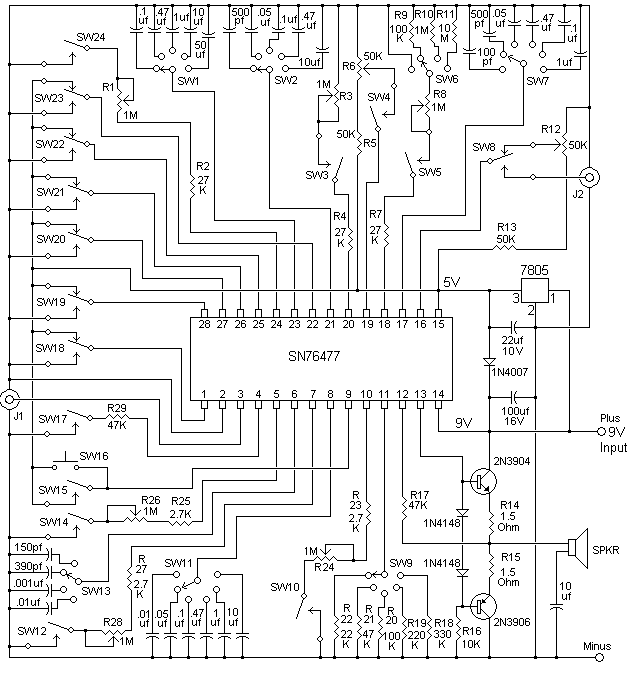
A redraw of a demonstration circuit used to try out most of the capabilities of the 76477 sound chip

The text below is intended to explain the use of the 76477 in the demo circuit shown at the right.

- SW1 is a five position rotary switch that selects which capacitor controls the one-shot circuit that sets the envelope timing.
- SW24 (toggle or momentary) is the one-shot trigger switch, closed position is active.
- R1 a one megohm linear potentiometer sets the actual one-shot timing (in series with fixed 27k resistor R2) within the range selected by SW1.
- SW2 is a five position rotary switch which selects which capacitor sets the range for the low frequency oscillator (SLF oscillator in future references).
- SW3 (toggle or momentary) is the switch used to turn the low frequency oscillator on or off.
- R3 a one megaohm linear potentiometer (in series with 27k fixed resistor R4) sets the actual frequency for the SLF oscillator.
- SW4 (toggle or momentary) is the switch that takes control of the voltage-controlled oscillator's (VCO) duty cycle (called pitch control). If the switch is off the VCO operates at 50% duty cycle by default.
- R6 a 50k ohm linear potentiometer is used (in series with a 50k ohm fixed resistor R5) form a voltage divider used to set the VCO duty cycle, the on time vs off time of the waveform (most variable inputs to this chip are looking for a resistance, this input looks for a voltage). The source voltage for this voltage divider (R5 & R6) is the five volt busbar.
- SW6 is a four position rotary switch which selects which one of three resistors (or no resistor) sets the range of frequency for the VCO.
- SW5 (toggle or momentary) is the switch that turns the VCO on or off.
- R8 is a one megohm linear potentiometer (in series with 27k fixed resistor R7) which sets the actual frequency of the VCO (within the range selected by SW6).
- SW7 is a six position rotary switch which selects which of six capacitors also sets the VCO frequency range.
- SW8 (toggle or momentary) is the switch that selects either an internal voltage control or an external voltage control for the VCO (if set to the external input with no input connected then there is no extra VCO control).
- R12 a 50k ohm linear potentiometer is used (in series with a 50k ohm fixed resistor R13) form a voltage divider to set an internal voltage to mimic the action of an external VCO input. The source for this voltage divider is the five volt busbar.
- SW9 is a five position rotary switch which selects which resistor to set the audio output level (called out as amplitude control resistor on the chip pinout).
- SW10 (toggle or momentary) is the switch that enables attack timing. If this switch is open, there is no attack slope (tone is instant on). If this switch is closed the attack slope is set by R24 (within the range selected by SW11).
- R24 is a one megohm linear potentiometer (in series with a 27k fixed resistor R23) which sets the actual attack timing (within the range selected by SW11).
- SW11 is a six position rotary switch which selects which of six capacitors also sets the limits of the timing of the attack and decay envelope generator.
- SW12 (toggle or momentary) is the switch that enables delay timing. If this switch is open, there is no decay delay slope (tone is instant off). If this switch is closed the decay slope is set by R24 (within the range selected by SW11).
- SW13 is a four position rotary switch which selects which one of four capacitors affects the noise filter.
- SW14 (toggle or momentary) is the switch that enables the noise filter.
- R26 is a one megohm linear potentiometer (in series with the 27k fixed resistor R25) which sets the actual response of the noise filter timing (within the range selected by SW13.
- SW15 and SW16 (toggle and momentary in parallel) these two switches are tied to pin 9 of the 76477 sound generator. Most demonstration circuits show these two switches in parallel from pin 9 to ground. Pin 9 is the ‘system enable’ pin for the 76477, if open the sound generator is off. If pin 9 is connected to ground, the sound generator is running. Both switches are included for that reason.
- SW17 (toggle or momentary) is the switch that enables the internal noise generator clock. If this switch is closed then the noise generator operates on its internal clock.
- R29 A 47k fixed resistor. This resistor is in series with SW17 and is the current reference for the internal noise generator clock. In the 76477 spec sheet this is called out as 47k. This value could be tweaked but straying too far from 47k might make the internal noise clock unstable. To control the clock frequency then the next Item, ‘J1' is a better choice.
- J1 External noise clock input. If this input is used SW17 should be open (or off). Waveform can be most any wave shape and most any frequency from a few Hz to about 2 mHz and can range from a half a volt to a maximum of five volts. Some very strange tones can be produced with a rather low frequency input to this jack.
- SW18 and SW19 (toggle or momentary) are switches that together control the logic for the envelope generator. If both switches are open then the VCO only is selected. If SW18 is closed and SW19 is open the envelope generator is controlled by the one-shot generator. If SW18 is open and SW19 is closed the mixer only is selected. If both SW18 and SW19 are closed the VCO is selected with alternating polarity.
- SW20 – SW21 and SW22 (toggle or momentary) are switches that together control the logic for the mixer; SW20, 21 and 22 open selects the VCO, SW20 on and SW21 and 22 open selects the super low frequency oscillator, with noise filter. SW21 on and SW20 and SW22 off selects the noise generator output only, SW20 and 21 on and SW22 off selects the SLF oscillator and the VCO. SW20 and 21 off and SW22 on selects the SLF oscillator only. SW20 and 22 on and SW21 off selects the SLF and the VCO and the noise generator. SW20 off and SW21 and 22 on selects the VCO and the noise filter. SW20 and 21 and 22 on inhibits the mixer (audio off).
- SW23 (toggle or momentary) is the switch that selects what voltage input the VCO will follow. If SW23 is open the VCO will be controlled by the SLF oscillator. If SW23 is closed then the VCO will be modulated by the voltage input to pin 16 (which in this circuit can be selected by SW8 to be the level set by R12 or an external voltage input to J2).
- J2 External VCO input voltage (selected or disabled by SW8. It can be most any wave shape and most any frequency from a few Hz to about several kHz and can range from a half a volt to a maximum of five volts.

Redraws of 76477 application circuits;

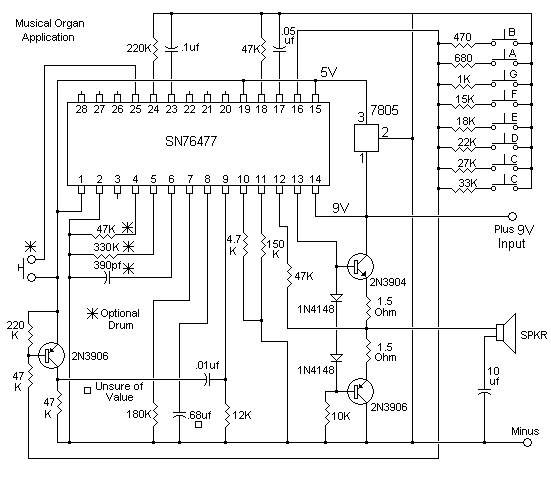
Musical organ

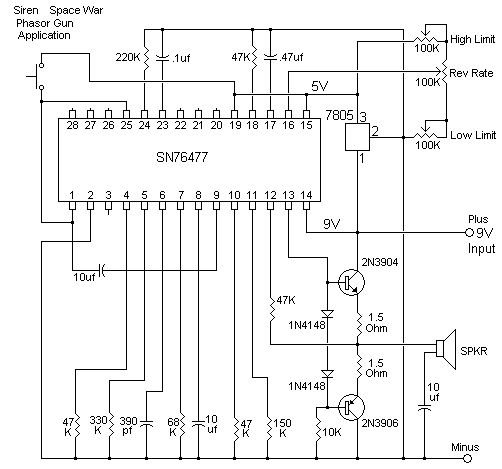
Siren / phasor

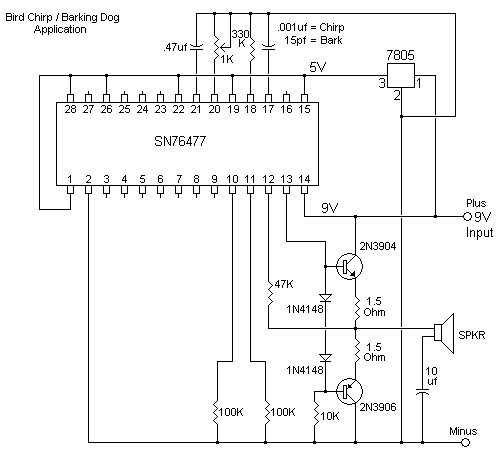
Barking dog

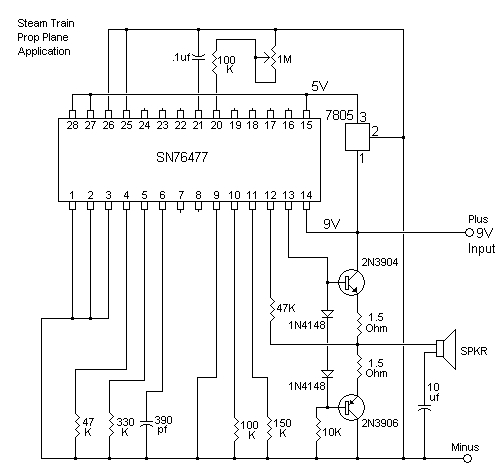
Train / prop plane sound

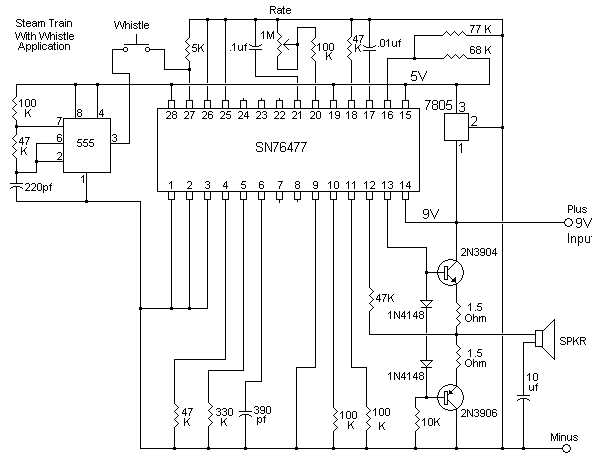
Steam train with whistle

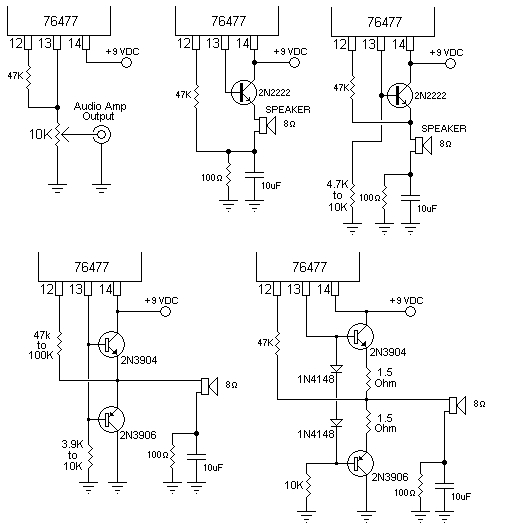
Five output structures for the 76477 chip

== Uses ==
Uses of the SN76477 include the following devices:

- Arcade games:
  - Space Invaders
  - Stratovox
  - Vanguard
  - Sheriff/Bandido
- Educational toys:
  - Gakken EX-System synthesizer
  - The Remco Electronic Sound FX Machine
- Electronic musical instruments:
- Home computers:
  - ABC 80
  - Interact Home Computer / Micronique Hector

== See also ==
- Texas Instruments SN76489 - simplified sound chip with 3x square wave and 1x white noise generator
