= Steve Vickers (computer scientist) =

British mathematician and computer scientist

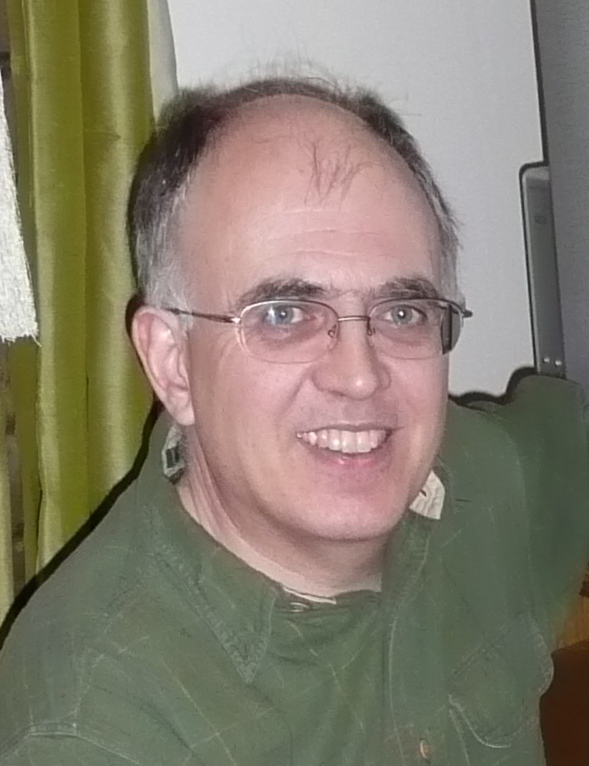
- Steve Vickers in 2007
- Citizenship: United Kingdom
- Education: University of Cambridge; University of Leeds
- Known for: Topology via Logic; ZX Spectrum firmware
- Scientific career
- Fields: Computer science; Mathematics
- Workplaces: Imperial College London; Open University; University of Birmingham
- Thesis: Universal strongly regular rings (1979)
- Doctoral advisor: Alfred Goldie

Steve Vickers (born 1952 or 1953) is a British mathematician and computer scientist. In the early 1980s, he wrote ROM firmware and manuals for three home computers, the ZX81, ZX Spectrum, and Jupiter Ace. The latter was produced by Jupiter Cantab, a short-lived company Vickers formed together with Richard Altwasser, after the two had left Sinclair Research. Since the late 1980s, Vickers has been an academic in the field of geometric logic, writing over 30 papers in scholarly journals on mathematical aspects of computer science. His book Topology via Logic has been influential over a range of fields (extending even to theoretical physics, where Christopher Isham of Imperial College London has cited Vickers as an early influence on his work on topoi and quantum gravity). In October 2018, he retired as senior lecturer at the University of Birmingham. As announced on his university homepage, he continues to supervise PhD students at the university and focus on his research.

== Education ==
Vickers graduated from King's College, Cambridge with a degree in mathematics and completed a PhD at Leeds University, also in mathematics.

== Sinclair Research ==
In 1980 he started working for Nine Tiles, which had previously written the Sinclair BASIC for the ZX80. He was responsible for the adaptation of the 4K ZX80 ROM into the 8K ROM used in the ZX81 and also wrote the ZX81 manual. He then wrote most of the ZX Spectrum ROM, and assisted with the user documentation.

Vickers left in 1982 to form "Rainbow Computing Co." with Richard Altwasser. The company became Jupiter Cantab and they were together responsible for the development of the commercially unsuccessful Jupiter Ace, a competitor to the similar ZX Spectrum.

== Academia ==
Originally at the Department of Computing at Imperial College London, Vickers later joined the Department of Pure Mathematics at the Open University before moving to the School of Computer Science at the University of Birmingham, where he is currently a senior lecturer and the research student tutor of the School of Computer Science.

== Research ==
Vickers' main interest lies within geometric logic. His book Topology via Logic introduces topology from the point of view of some computational insights developed by Samson Abramsky and Mike Smyth. It stresses the point-free approach and can be understood as dealing with theories in the so-called geometric logic, which was already known from topos theory and is a more stringent form of intuitionistic logic. However, the book was written in the language of classical mathematics.

Extending the ideas to toposes (as generalised spaces) he found himself channelled into constructive mathematics in a geometric form and in Topical Categories of Domains he set out a geometrisation programme of, where possible, using this geometric mathematics as a tool for treating point-free spaces (and toposes) as though they had "enough points". Much of his subsequent work has been in case studies to show that, with suitable techniques, it was indeed possible to do useful mathematics geometrically. In particular, a notion of "geometric transformation of points to spaces" gives a natural fibrewise treatment of topological bundles. A recent project of his has been to connect this with the topos approaches to physics as developed by Chris Isham and others (see Doering and Isham's What is a Thing? Topos Theory in the Foundations of Physics) at Imperial College, and Klaas Landsman's group at Radboud University Nijmegen (see Heunen, Landsman and Spitters' A Topos for Algebraic Quantum Theory).

== Bibliography ==
- Steven Vickers, "An induction principle for consequence in arithmetic universes", Journal of Pure and Applied Algebra 216 (8–9), ISSN 0022-4049, pp. 1705 – 2068, 2012.
- Jung, Achim and Moshier, M. Andrew and Vickers, Steven, "Presenting dcpos and dcpo algebras", in Bauer, A. and Mislove, M., Proceedings of the 24th Conference on the Mathematical Foundations of Programming Semantics (MFPS XXIV), pp. 209–229, Electronic Notes in Theoretical Computer Science, Elsevier, 2008.
- Steven Vickers, "Cosheaves and connectedness in formal topology", Annals of Pure and Applied Logic, ISSN 0168-0072, 2009.
- Steven Vickers, "A localic theory of lower and upper integrals", Mathematical Logic Quarterly, 54 (1), pp. 109–103, 2008.
- Steven Vickers, "Locales and toposes as spaces", in Aiello, Marco and Pratt-Hartmann, Ian E. and van Benthem, Johan F.A.K., Springer, Handbook of Spatial Logics, Springer, 2007, ISBN 978-1-4020-5586-7, Chapter 8, pp. 429–496.
- Palmgren, Erik and Vickers, Steven, "Partial Horn logic and cartesian categories", Annals of Pure and Applied Logic, 145 (3), pp. 314–353, ISSN 0168-0072, 2007.
- Steven Vickers, "Localic completion of generalized metric spaces I, Theory and Applications of Categories", ISSN 1201-561X, 14, pp. 328–356, 2005.
- Steven Vickers, "Localic completion of generalized metric spaces II: Powerlocales, Journal of Logic and Analysis", ISSN 1759-9008, 1 (11), pp. 1–48, 2009.
- Steven Vickers, "The double powerlocale and exponentiation: a case study in geometric logic", Theoretical Computer Science, ISSN 0304-3975, vol. 316, pp. 297–321, 2004.
- Steven Vickers, "Topical Categories of Domains", in Winskel, Proceedings of the CLICS workshop, Aarhus, Computer Science Department, Aarhus University, 1992.
- Vickers, S. J., "Topology via Constructive Logic", in Moss and Ginzburg and de Rijke, Logic, Language and Computation Vol II, Proceedings of conference on Information-Theoretic Approaches to Logic, Language, and Computation, 1996, ISBN 1575861801, 157586181X, CSLI Publications, Stanford, pp. 336–345, 1999.
- Vickers, S. J., "Toposes pour les vraiment nuls", in Edalat, A. and Jourdan, S. and McCusker, G., Advances in Theory and Formal Methods of Computing 1996, ISBN 1-86094-031-5, Imperial College Press, London, pp. 1–12, 1996.
- Vickers, S. J., "Toposes pour les nuls", Techreport Doc96/4, Department of Computing, Imperial College London, (first published in Semantics Society Newsletter no. 4).
- Broda, K. and Eisenbach, S. and Khoshnevisan, H. and Vickers, S.J., "Reasoned Programming", ISBN 0-13-098831-6, Prentice Hall, International Series in Computer Science, 1994.
- Johnstone, P. T. and Vickers, S. J., "Preframe Presentations Present", in Carboni, A. and Pedicchio, M.C. and Rosolini, G., Category Theory – Proceedings, Como 1990, ISBN 3-540-54706-1, 0-387-54706-1, Lecture Notes in Mathematics, 1488, Springer-Verlag, 1991.
- Steven Vickers, "Topology Via Logic", Cambridge University Press, ISBN 0-521-57651-2, 1996.
- Doring, Andreas and Isham, Chris, "What is a Thing?: Topos Theory in the Foundations of Physics", in Bob Coecke, New Structures in Physics, Chapter 13, pp. 753–940, Lecture Notes in Physics, 813, Springer, 2011, ISBN 978-3-642-12820-2, (also see arXiv:0803.0417v1.)
- Heunen, Chris and Landsman, Nicolaas P. and Spitters, Bas, A Topos for Algebraic Quantum Theory, 2009, Communications in Mathematical Physics, 291 (1), pp. 63–110, ISSN 0010-3616 (Print) 1432-0916 (Online).
