= Jupiter Cantab =

English home computer company

- Founded: 1982
- Founder: Sinclair Research; Richard Altwasser; Steven Vickers
- Defunct: 1983
- Headquarters: Cambridge, United Kingdom
- Products: Home computer hardware

Jupiter Cantab Limited was a Cambridge based home computer company. Its main product was the 1983 Forth-based Jupiter Ace.

The company was founded in 1982 by two ex-Sinclair Research staffers, Richard Altwasser and Steven Vickers. Their machine was, externally, remarkably similar to the ZX Spectrum, with a copycat rubber keyboard. It also used the same Z80 processor. The Ace's video output was limited to monochrome like the ZX-81.

The £90 Ace was a flop in both the UK and US markets. In the US it was intended to be sold as the Ace 4000, although only 800 were ever made. The Forth language, although considered powerful, was not as popular or accessible as the already well-established BASIC language featured in competing microcomputers. However, the Ace's price of £89.95 — against £39.95 for the ZX81, the successor to Sinclair's ZX80 — was more likely the primary reason for slow sales.

The company went bankrupt in November 1983 and its assets were sold to Boldfield Computing Ltd in 1984. The remaining hardware was sold-off into 1985. Boldfield Computing Ltd also commissioned some software for it, including various games, database, and spread sheet software. Documentation to this exists and is held by the current owners of the brand.

The sale of Boldfield’s IT solution business in 2006, excluded the rights to the Jupiter Ace IP and brand, but this was later sold to Andrews UK Limited in 2015.
