= OnForce =

- Type: Subsidiary
- Industry: Workforce management, Freelancer marketplace, online staffing
- Founded: February 2003 by Jeffrey Leventhal
- Headquarters: Lexington, Massachusetts, United States
- Area served: Worldwide
- Key people: James Fabiano (General Manager); Gabe Miano (VP, Product Management); Mike Delelys (VP, Engineering); Don Anderson (VP, Operations)
- Parent: WorkMarket
- Website: www.onforce.com

OnForce was a Freelancer Management System (FMS) for Field Services that enabled companies to search for, engage with, manage, and pay non-employee professionals. Based out of Lexington, Massachusetts, it was a former independent business unit of Adecco Group.

== History ==
ComputerRepair.com was founded by Jeffrey Leventhal in Boca Raton, FL and launched its initial IT service-matching web application in February 2003. The business evolved its platform into an online marketplace transacting millions of service events by 2005. The business focused on the IT services industry and the platform allowed its clients to create assignments, match them to workers, and then pay for completed work. In December 2005 the business was renamed OnForce and raised a $15 million Series A round. Around 2007 OnForce introduced PowerMatch, a bi-directional matching algorithm to find field service technicians. In May 2008 the company expanded to consumer electronics and introduced a general contractor model in 2010.

=== Acquisition ===
In August 2014, Adecco Group, a Swiss multinational human resource consulting company acquired OnForce FMS and merged with its VMS company. In the agreement, Beeline agreed to partner with OnForce's freelance management system to give clients and partners access to the supply chain of the workforce. OnForce was acquired by WorkMarket in 2017.

== Overview ==
OnForce connected talented professionals directly with the companies that needed them. As a freelancer management system (FMS) for field services, companies were able to search for, engage with, manage, and pay non-employee freelancers and contractors. Its FMS solution supported IT and consumer electronic categories such as computers, printers, networking, VoIP, Point of Sale, home theater, and cabling. Contractors used OnForce to manage their profiles, rates, and engagements.

== Industry Recognition ==
- OnForce CEO Peter Cannone (Joined 2009) Among Staffing Industry Analysts Top 100 Most Influential 2014.
- OnForce CEO Peter Cannone Among Staffing Industry Analysts Top 100 Most Influential 2013.
- Red Herring North America: Top 100 Award 2013
- Channel Insider Bull’s Eye Award 2009 Champion
- CRN Top 100 Most Influential Executives 2009
- CRN Power Women of the Channel 2009
- American Business Awards: The Stevies – Finalist 2008
- Boston Business Journal Best Places to Work 2008
