= SUPERAntiSpyware =

Anti-spyware software

- Developer: RealDefense
- Stable release: 10.0.1282 / December 18, 2025; 10 months ago
- Operating system: Microsoft Windows
- Size: 215.7 MB
- Type: Anti-spyware
- License: Proprietary software Free edition: Freeware; personal use only Pro edition: Annual Subscription
- Website: www.superantispyware.com

SUPERAntiSpyware is an antispyware software application that detects and removes spyware, adware, trojans, rogue security software, computer worms, rootkits, and other potentially unwanted or harmful programs. While it can identify some forms of malware, it is not intended to replace antivirus software.

== Details ==
SUPERAntiSpyware's virus definitions are updated several times per week, with software build updates typically released on a monthly basis. The software is designed to be operate alongside other security applications, and can be used in environments where compatibility issues exist with some other antispyware products.

The product is available as freeware for personal use, with limited functionality.

== Reception ==
In 2011, PC Magazine rated SUPERAntiSpyware as "Dismal", citing the absence of real-time protection as well as low detection rates and poor performance in malware removal testing. A 2020 re-evaluation revised the rating to "Average", noting improvements in detection rates and overall performance, while also stating that the software continued to lack features found in full security suites.

Both the freeware and commercial versions received an average user rating of 4 out of 5 stars on CNET's Download.com website.

== Acquisition ==
On 16 July 2011, SUPERAntiSpyware was acquired by Support.com through as asset purchase transaction valued at $8.5 million. All employees, including founder Nick Skrepetos, joined Support.com following the acquisition.

On 26 January 2023, SUPERAntiSpyware was acquired by RealDefense, LLC from Support.com as part of RealDefense’s broader acquisition strategy. This transaction marked the company’s fifth consumer software brand acquisition since 2017.
