= Henry Taub =

American businessman and philanthropist (1927–2011)

Henry Taub (September 20, 1927 – March 31, 2011) was an American businessman and philanthropist of Hungarian-Jewish descent who was a co-founder of ADP.

Raised in Paterson, New Jersey, Taub attended Eastside High School.

Taub was educated at New York University. He graduated from NYU in 1947 with a degree in accounting.

In 1949, he founded Automatic Payrolls Inc. (API), a manual payroll processing service in Northern New Jersey. That company is now known as Automatic Data Processing (ADP) and is the leading provider of computerized payroll and benefits management services to employers in the U.S. He retired from ADP in the mid-1980s.

Taub served as national president of the American Technion Society from 1974 to 1976, and chair of the Technion International Board of Governors from 1990 to 2003. At the time of his death in 2011, he held the title of Honorary Chair of the Technion international Board of Governors, and was a member of the ATS National Board of Directors and New York Metropolitan Region Board.

He and his wife, Marilyn, spearheaded numerous Technion projects, including the Henry and Marilyn Taub and Family Science and Technology Center, a Technion campus landmark and home to its Faculty of Computer Science, considered one of the best in the world; the Leaders in Science and Technology Faculty Recruitment Program; and the Henry and Marilyn Taub Fund for the Future.

He was awarded the Technion Medal, a Technion honorary doctorate, and a Technion honorary fellowship. A special American Technion Society celebration in 2004 at the Plaza Hotel in New York City was held in tribute to Taub's lifetime of brilliant and dedicated service.

A resident of Tenafly, New Jersey, Taub died on March 31, 2011, due to complications of leukemia.
