= WorkMarket =

WorkMarket by ADP
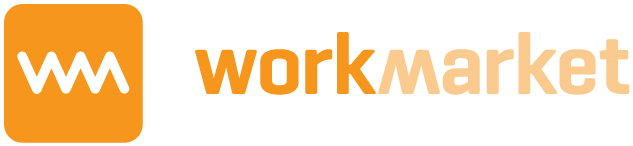
- Industry: Enterprise software
- Founded: 2010
- Founders: Jeffrey Leventhal
- Headquarters: New York, New York
- Number of employees: 156
- Parent: Automatic Data Processing (ADP)
- Website: workmarket.com

WorkMarket is a New York City-based company that provides an online platform and marketplace for businesses to manage contingent workers and IT talent. The company was founded in May 2010 by Jeffrey Leventhal.

In January 2018, WorkMarket was acquired by the payroll automation firm, Automatic Data Processing (ADP) for an undisclosed amount.

== Software ==
The company markets its online platform and marketplace directly and through partnerships to business that work with and leverage freelancers, contractors, and consultants as part of their overall talent strategy. Many companies also use WorkMarket independently from the marketplace to manage their existing freelance talent communities.

WorkMarket allows "buyers" to find workers, verify credentials, engage and onboard talent, manage work assignments and projects, process payments, and rate workers. For workers, WorkMarket provides a marketplace to search and apply for assignments, share resumes, and build digital portfolios. Both companies and workers use WorkMarket's dashboard to manage current assignments. Workers can use the mobile app to find and manage assignments.

== History ==
CEO and founder Jeffrey Leventhal conceived of the idea for WorkMarket after founding and selling OnForce, a previous online marketplace business he started that helped manage IT talent. His industry experience led him to believe that there was an opportunity to provide a more efficient method for hiring and managing 1099 contractors. To form a founding team, Leventhal agreed to partner with Jeffrey Wald. In 2011, the company launched a beta version of the WorkMarket platform to a group of 20 companies. Initially, WorkMarket operated as an invitation-only service while it worked to build a large base of corporate clients.

In January 2015, WorkMarket hired Stephen DeWitt as its CEO.

WorkMarket's board of directors and advisor team includes Union Square Ventures' Fred Wilson, Spark Capital's Mo Koyfman, Jeffrey Leventhal, Tig Gilliam, and Jordan Levy. Tig Gilliam was named chairman in February 2015.

Between 2010 and 2017, WorkMarket raised a total of $60+ million in venture funding.

== Recognition ==
Gartner recognized WorkMarket as a Cool Vendor in Procurement Sourcing in 2015. WorkMarket has also been featured in Spend Matters research.

Having experienced two-year growth of 581%, WorkMarket was named No. 20 on the 2014 list of Crain's New York Business Fast 50. WorkMarket has also been recognized by Forbes as one of America's Most Promising Companies for 2014.

Jeffrey Leventhal has also been honored as Staffing Industry Analysts Top 100 and he and Jeffrey Wald have been cited on the changing freelance economy by Bloomberg, Fortune, Huffington Post, Staffing Industry Analysts, CRN Magazine, Entrepreneur, IT Business Edge, U.S. News & World Report, and HR.com.
