= Memotech MTX =

Series of home computers released in 1983–84

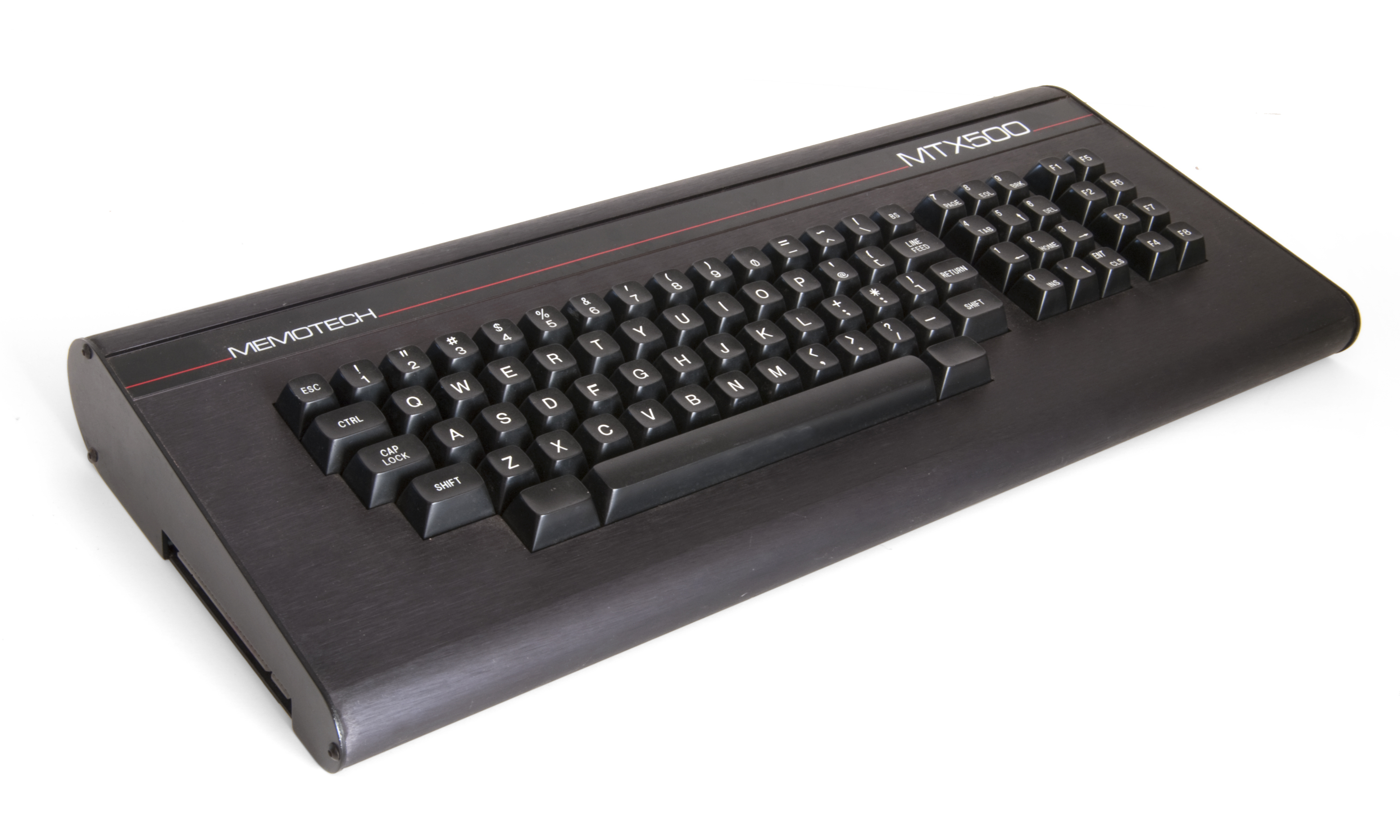
- Memotech MTX500
- Manufacturer: Memotech
- Type: Microcomputer
- Released: 1983; 43 years ago
- Introductory price: MTX500: £275 (equivalent to £935 in 2025) MTX512: £315 (equivalent to £1,071 in 2025) RS128: £399 (equivalent to £1,300 in 2025)
- Operating system: CP/M (optional)
- CPU: Zilog Z80A @ 4MHz
- Memory: 32KB (MTX 500), 64KB (MTX 512) or 128KB (RS 128)
- Removable storage: Cassette, cartridge, 5.25" floppy disk (optional)
- Display: 256 x 192 resolution, 16 colors
- Graphics: TMS9929A or TMS9928A
- Sound: SN76489A 3.5mm phono
- Controller input: Joysticks (2x Atari pin-out)
- Connectivity: Parallel port, cassette, joysticks (2x), RS-232 (2x optional), audio, TV (RF), monitor (composite)
- Dimensions: 48.6 x 20.3 x 5.7 cm (19.1 x 8 x 2.2 inches)
- Weight: 2.6 kg (5.7 lbs)

The Memotech MTX500 and MTX512 are a range of 8-bit Zilog Z80A based home computers released by the British company Memotech in 1983 and sold mainly in the UK, France, Germany and Scandinavia. Originally a manufacturer of memory add-ons for Sinclair machines, Memotech developed their own competing computer when it was perceived the expansion pack business would no longer be viable.

The Memotech machines were technically similar to, although not compatible with, the MSX standard, making use of the same CPU and video chip. The machines were particularly distinguished from other microcomputers available at the time by the generous maximum memory ceiling. The 500 and 512 models could be expanded internally up to 512K, an unusually large amount of RAM in 1983 for a computer aimed at home use.

The MTX range saw the addition of the RS128 in 1984 which was a similar machine but with more memory. The machines achieved only modest sales, not assisted by the unfortunate timing of being released shortly before a period of reducing interest in UK home micro purchases through 1984, when a number of other British micro manufacturers entered financial difficulties. The MTX was selling into a highly competitive space, with the much cheaper ZX Spectrum finding favour with home users, the BBC Micro conquering the education market and the IBM PC making inroads into becoming a standard for business.

The prospect of a very large contract with the Soviet Union was on the horizon by 1985 and a Russian version of the machine was designed, complete with a bright red case. This could have been the saviour of the range but ultimately the deal fell through and Memotech entered bankruptcy. The company was subsequently relaunched and the final version of the machine was the MTX512 Series 2 released in 1986, produced mainly as a way of using up stocks of parts before the business moved on to other ventures.

The MTX512 (together with the FDX floppy drive peripheral) is remembered for an appearance in the 1985 comedy movie Weird Science where it had a central role in the plot, being used to conjure the character Lisa played by Kelly LeBrock.

== Technical specifications ==
The MTX500 was fitted as standard with 32 KB of user RAM, while the MTX512 had 64KB, and the RS128 had 128KB. An additional 16KB of dedicated video RAM was also present. By contrast, many other machines of the era used a non-trivial fraction of the advertised total memory for video display and the RAM available to the user was less than it may have seemed.

All machines had a Zilog Z80A CPU running at 4 MHz which could only address a maximum of 64KB at any one time, larger amounts of RAM were accessed through bank switching.

The machine featured a TMS9918 series video chip, either a TMS9929A or TMS9928A depending on the region, providing a resolution of 256 x 192 in 15 colours (plus transparent) and up to 32 sprites. A SN76489A sound chip generated 3 voices plus a pink noise channel with a 6 octave range.

The system interfaces offered were a Centronics printer port, two joystick ports, a proprietary Z80 bus edge connector (which doubled as a cartridge port), 2400 baud cassette ports (mic and ear), RF for use with a TV, composite monitor outputs and an audio jack. An "uncommitted" generic I/O port was available but there was no external connector; this was supplied from a DIL socket on the motherboard. There was one internal expansion slot that could accept two expansion cards via daisy chaining. An optional "communications" board was available for use with the internal slot, which added two 19,200 baud RS-232 interfaces and an interface for the FDX disk peripheral.

Networking was supported over RS-232 via the communications board and up to 255 MTX machines could be connected with the MTX "Node/Ring" system.

All models had 24KB of ROM accessible in the first 16KB of address space. The extra 8KB of ROM was available through bank switching. The ROM could be switched out entirely, allowing the full 16-bit address space to be used for RAM.

The Memotech series featured an aluminium case and full-size 79-key keyboard with mechanical full-travel keys. This was a distinctive feature as many competing home computers of the time used a cost-reduced chiclet, membrane or rubber keyboard that was difficult to type on.

== Software ==
An MTX variant of the BASIC language interpreter was supplied on ROM as standard, which was a user expectation in the mid 80s for a home computer. The BASIC had extended graphics commands and also integrated support for turtle graphics in the style of the Logo language used in education.

A Z80 assembler/disassembler was also included. The source and object versions of machine code programs occupied the same space in RAM allowing for storage within less memory. Machine code could also be mixed arbitrarily with BASIC to enhance software performance. This was a rarer feature, but was seen in the BASIC of some other contemporary machines such as the BBC Micro and Camputers Lynx. A machine code monitor was included called Front Panel that could be used for debugging programs. Monitors were popular in the 1970s as a method of interacting with computers but were a less common standard feature when the Memotech was released.

A novel proprietary programming language called MTX Noddy was available in ROM that was a card based information retrieval system somewhat similar in concept to HyperCard. A set of cards can be filled with arbitrary information using an integrated text editor (the user can type anywhere on the screen) and then saved for later retrieval by name. A simplified Noddy programming language aimed at novices allows the cards to be linked together with logic steps based on if/else statements. The user can be asked questions and based on the typed response, the Noddy program then advances to another card. From this software such as simple databases, an expert system or text adventure games could be constructed. Noddy cards could also be integrated with BASIC. The name of the software is a reference to British slang, meaning simple or trivial.

The Memotech supported "virtual screens" which were a form of primitive window. Areas of the screen could be defined that operated independently and the user could switch between them for different tasks. The output of a program could be directed to one user defined window and then the output of a different program to another window. The Memotech did not use a mouse, window size and position on the screen was controlled using commands. While the concept had been previously invented, windowing support was an uncommon feature for a personal computer in 1983. The Macintosh and subsequent Microsoft Windows that popularised the windowing user interface style would not be released until later years.

The MTX could run the CP/M operating system and a license for CP/M 2.2 was included with the purchase of the optional FDX and HDX disk peripherals. Use of CP/M enabled compatibility with a large library of existing software applications and enabled the machine to be a viable business proposition. At this time, the soon to be dominant MS-DOS was only at the beginning of its ascent and CP/M was a widely popular platform for software releases.

Many commercial games were developed for the Memotech MTX.

== Peripherals ==
The FDX (Floppy Disk EXpansion) was a data storage peripheral with space for expansion cards. The device could be used with any of the machines in the range but at least 64 KB of RAM was needed, necessitating an upgrade for the Memotech 500 model, and required the optional communications board to which it attached with a ribbon cable. It was sold with either one or two 5.25" floppy disk drives installed and contained a SASI interface supporting up to four drives in total. The system also supported older 8" floppy drives. Four RAM disk cards (referred to as silicon disks) could be added within the FDX chassis, each with up to 8 MB of storage, providing 32 MB of solid state storage in total. These cards could emulate drives accessible by CP/M with the intent of accelerating software performance versus running software from mechanical disks. In contrast to modern SSDs, these disks were volatile, meaning the data was lost when power is removed.

An optional colour 80 column x 24 row video card could also be added to the FDX unit, a display mode which was often perceived as important for running popular business software such as WordStar and SuperCalc, but was not natively supported by the MTX system. A novel feature was multiple monitor support, which was rare for a 1980s personal computer. The MTX internal video could be output simultaneously with the FDX video output. This enabled e.g. a program listing to be displayed on one monitor with the output of the program on another. The card also offered teletext character compatibility, a 160 x 96 graphics mode and supported a light pen.

With the addition of the FDX peripheral, the MTX resembled a desktop PC configuration but the system logic was mostly contained within the keyboard and the FDX unit was principally a storage add-on.

A variant of the FDX called the HDX was produced, that was sold with a 5 - 20 MB hard disk combined with a single 5.25" floppy drive. A small SDX disk controller peripheral was also manufactured that allowed connection of external floppy drive units. A version was also available that had a 3.5" drive integrated. These units did not require the communications board and plugged into the left side edge connector.

A Memotech monitor was made available around the time of the FDX launch together with a branded cassette deck and a Memotech printer with the part number DMX80, which was a rebadged Panasonic model.

A high resolution graphics adapter was available in 1984 called the HRX that could display close to true colour (2^{18}, or 262,144 colours) images at 256x256 pixel resolution and enabled frame capture from a video camera. This video mode was well beyond that typically offered on personal computers of the era. The attached MTX computer delivered image manipulation features such as scale, rotate, blur, sharpen, edge detection and contrast adjustment. It could also overlay painted vector graphics onto the image. The HRX adapter was supplied as a separate chassis containing the video interface ADC/DAC circuitry, additional RAM and a controller. An HRX system was priced at £4,500 (in 1984) and would form the basis of Memotech's later video wall business.
