= Hector (microcomputer) =

Series of microcomputers produced in France in the early 1980s

Hector (or Victor Lambda) are a series of a microcomputers produced in France in the early 1980s.

In January 1980, Michel Henric-Coll founded a company named Lambda Systems in Toulouse, that would import a computer (produced by Interact Electronics Inc of Ann Arbor, Michigan) to France. The computer was sold under the name of Victor Lambda.

Lambda Systems went bankrupt in July 1981, along with Interact. In December 1981, Micronique, an electronic components company based in southern Paris, acquires the rights to the Victor Lambda.

In 1982, Victor Lambda Diffusion, a subsidiary, distributes the Victor Lambda. The first machines built in the United States were not a success, and the following models were designed and produced in France at the headquarters of the Micronique company. The company uses the slogan: "The French Personal Computer".

In 1983, the Victor is renamed Hector, to avoid confusion with the machines from the Californian company Victor Technologies (formerly Sirius Systems Technology).

The last model introduced was the Hector MX, with production of the series ending in 1985. The series was not successful, due to the focus on the French market, intense competition from Amstrad machines and high prices.

== Models ==
=== Victor Lambda ===
The Victor Lambda was a rebranded Interact Home Computer(also called The Interact Family Computer 2) microcomputer. Introduced in 1980, it had a chiclet keyboard and built-in cassette recorder for data storage.

Specifications:

- CPU: Intel i8080, 2.0 MHz
- Memory: 8K RAM, expandable to 16K RAM; 2K ROM
- OS: Basic Level II (Microsoft BASIC v4.7); EDU-Basic (both loaded from tape)
- Keyboard: 53-key chiclet
- Display: 17 × 12 characters text in 8 colors; 112 × 78 with 4 colors from a palette of 8
- Sound: SN76477 (one voice, four octaves)
- Ports: Television (RGB), two joysticks, RS232 (optional)
- Built-in cassette recorder (1200 B/s)
- PSU: External AC transformer

=== Hector 1 (Victor Lambda 2) ===
The Hector 1 was a 1983 computer, based on the Victor Lambda. Initially sold as Victor Lambda 2 it was renamed to avoid trademark confusion. Also known as Hector 16K. More than 100 games were published for this machine.

It was eventually considered as an entry level machine.

Specifications:

- CPU: Zilog Z80 @ 1.7 MHz
- Memory: 16K RAM
- OS: Basic Level III (loaded from tape)
- Keyboard: mechanical
- Display: 17 × 12 text in 8 colors, 112 × 78 in 8 colors
- Sound: SN76477N (one voice, four octaves)
- Ports: Television (RGB), two joysticks, RS232 (optional)
- Built-in cassette recorder (1200 B/s)
- PSU: Built-in

=== Hector 2 HR (Victor Lambda 2HR) ===
The Hector 2HR is a 1983 computer with a Zilog Z80 processor, 16KB of ROM and 48KB of RAM. Initially sold as Victor Lambda 2HR, it was renamed avoid trademark confusion. Graphics were improved, with a resolution of 243x231 in 4 colors, and 40x23 character text. It has an built-in cassette recorder and an optional disk drive (DISK II). At launch there were sixty software titles available on tape. It was considered as a more serious machine for those wishing to program their own games.

Specifications:

- CPU: Zilog Z80A @ 5 MHz
- Memory: 48K RAM; 4KB ROM
- OS: Basic Level III (loaded from tape)
- Keyboard: mechanical
- Display: 40 × 22 text; 112 × 78 in 8 colours, 243 × 231 in 4 colours
- Sound: SN76477 (one voice, four octaves)
- Built-in cassette recorder

==== DISK II device ====
The "Disk II" is a dual external 5 1/4-inch floppy disk drive with a dedicated processor. The Hector processor would handle the screen, keyboard and printer, while the floppy drive processor would run CP/M and manage floppy disks. Communication took place via the bi-directional parallel port.

==== Programming languages ====
The programming language is not available in ROM but loaded at startup. This makes it possible to distribute several languages, with BASIC 80, Pascal MT+, Cobol 80, Fortran 77, Forth and Assembly being available.

=== Hector 2HR+ ===
The Hector 2HR+, also released in 1983, is similar to the previous model, but including the BASIC language in ROM (thus freeing up more RAM memory for user programs).

Specifications:

- CPU: Zilog Z80A @ 5 MHz
- Memory: 48K RAM; 16KB ROM
- OS: Basic Level III
- Keyboard: mechanical
- Display: 40 × 22 text in 8 colours; 112 × 78 in 8 colours, 243 × 231 in 4 colours
- Sound: SN76477 (one voice, four octaves)
- Ports: Television (RGB, SECAM), two joysticks, Centronics, Disc Drive
- Built-in cassette recorder
- PSU: Built-in

=== Hector HRX ===
The Hector HRX, also released in 1983, is similar to the previous model, but changes BASIC for a Forth language interpreter in ROM and features a 64KB RAM. An early 1983 review mentioned as positive compatibility with existing Lambda II HR software, but pointed lack of high-profile titles like arcade game conversions. It was considered as a professional machine, capable of running small business applications like text processors, spreadsheets and databases. A 1985 review of the system praised the varied peripherals available, but again criticized the lack of software.

Specifications:

- CPU: Zilog Z80A @ 5 MHz
- Memory: 64K RAM; 16K ROM
- OS: Forth
- Keyboard: mechanical
- Display: 40 × 22 text in 8 colours; 112 × 78 in 8 colours, 243 × 231 in 4 colours
- Sound: SN76477 (one voice, four octaves)
- Ports: Television (RGB, SECAM), two joysticks, Centronics, Disc Drive
- Built-in cassette recorder
- PSU: Built-in

=== Hector MX ===
The Hector MX, released in 1985, is similar to the HRX but offers BASIC, Forth, Logo and Assembly as languages available in ROM.

Specifications:

- CPU: Zilog Z80A @ 5 MHz
- Memory: 48K RAM; 64K ROM
- OS: BASIC 3X, HRX Forth, Logo, Assembly
- Keyboard: mechanical
- Display: 40 × 22 text in 8 colours; 112 × 78 in 8 colours, 243 × 231 in 4 colours
- Sound: SN76477 (one voice, four octaves)
- Ports: Television (RGB, SECAM), two joysticks, Centronics, Disc Drive
- Built-in cassette recorder
- PSU: Built-in

== Software ==
There are 135 commercial titles on this list. Some software like WordStar or Multiplan exists for this series of machines, along with many small games. They are also compatible with the Interact Home Computer

| Title | Alternative name | Publisher | Year | Type |
|---|---|---|---|---|
| Addition | Add Em Up | Interact Electronics | 1978 | Video game |
| Alunissage | | Algorithme | 1981 | Video game |
| Arithmétique et Tables | | Micronique | | Utility |
| Asteroïdes | Hot Rocks | Interact Electronics | 1982 | Video game |
| Auto Formation Hector - 1 sur 6 | | Micronique | | Utility |
| Auto Formation Hector - 2 sur 6 | | Micronique | | Utility |
| Auto Formation Hector - 3 sur 6 | | Micronique | | Utility |
| Auto Formation Hector - 4 sur 6 | | Micronique | | Utility |
| Auto Formation Hector - 5 sur 6 | | Micronique | | Utility |
| Auto Formation Hector - 6 sur 6 | | Micronique | | Utility |
| Auto Lumière, L' | | Algorithme | | Video game |
| Backgammon | | Interact Electronics | 1980 | Video game |
| Balade dans Paris | | Algorithme | | Video game |
| Baroudeur, Le | | Algorithme | | Video game |
| Base Spatiale | | Micronique | | Video game |
| Bataille Navale | | Micronique | | Video game |
| Batter-Up | | Interact Electronics | 1982 | Video game |
| Beat The Clock | | Interact Electronics | 1980 | Video game |
| Biorhythm | | Interact Electronics | 1978 | Utility |
| Blackjack | | Interact Electronics | 1979 | Video game |
| Bombardement | | Micronique | | Video game |
| Calcul Mental | | Micronique | | Utility |
| Calculator | | Interact Electronics | 1979 | Utility |
| Casino | | Micronique | | Video game |
| Castle | | Interact Electronics | 1982 | Video game |
| Catacombs | | Interact Electronics | 1983 | Video game |
| Cauchemar | | Algorithme | | Video game |
| Caverne des Lutins, La | | Micronique | | Video game |
| Chain Reaction | | Interact Electronics | 1983 | Video game |
| Chatbyrinthe | Computer Maze | Interact Electronics | 1978 | Video game |
| Checkbook Balancer | | Interact Electronics | 1979 | Utility |
| Chenille, La | | Micronique | | Video game |
| Combat! | | Micronique | 1980 | Video game |
| Concentration | | Interact Electronics | 1978 | Video game |
| Contratac | | Micronique | | Video game |
| Cow-Boys | Showdown | Interact Electronics | 1978 | Video game |
| Crazy 8 | | Interact Electronics | | Video game |
| Crédits | | Interact Electronics | | Utility |
| Cristelium | | Micronique | | Video game |
| Dé + 2 | Knockdown | Interact Electronics | 1978 | Video game |
| Decimal Tic-Tac-Toe. | | Interact Electronics | | Video game |
| Dédale | | Micronique | | Video game |
| Désert des Tartares, Le | | Micronique | | Video game |
| Dogfight | | Interact Electronics | 1978 | Video game |
| Double Trouble | | Interact Electronics | 1983 | Video game |
| Dragon du Donjon, Le | | Algorithme | 1983 | Video game |
| Earth Outpost I | | Micro Video | 1980 | Video game |
| Entrainement au Calcul | | Micronique | | Utility |
| Envahisseurs, Les | Alien Invaders | Micronique | 1981 | Video game |
| Etoile Noire | | Micronique | | Video game |
| Extension Glouton | | Micronique | | Video game |
| Flipper | Heads-Up-Pinball | Algorithme | 1982 | Video game |
| Formule 1 | | Micronique | | Video game |
| Fractions Simplification | | Micronique | | Utility |
| Furet, Le | | Micronique | | Video game |
| Galaxius | | Micronique | | Video game |
| Glouton, Le | Packrat, Extension Glouton | Micronique | 1981 | Video game |
| Goofy Golf | Micro Golf | Interact Electronics | 1982 | Video game |
| Grand Prix | | Micronique | | Video game |
| Grenouille | Wing It! | Interact Electronics | 1982 | Video game |
| Hammurabi | | Interact Electronics | | Video game |
| Hector Géo-France | | Micronique | | Utility |
| Hector Mémoire | | Micronique | | Video game |
| Hector-Man | | Micronique | 1984 | Video game |
| Hep, Taxi ! | | Micronique | | Video game |
| Hibou Taquin | | Algorithme | 1984 | Video game |
| Hyams | | Micronique | | Video game |
| Identités Remarquables | | Micronique | | Utility |
| Isola | | Micronique | | Video game |
| Jackpot | | Algorithme | | Video game |
| Jeep Lunaire | | Micronique | | Video game |
| Jumping-Jack | | Micronique | 1983 | Video game |
| King of the Road | | Interact Electronics | 1982 | Video game |
| Laby 1 | | Algorithme | | Video game |
| Lahrkmar: La Cité oubliée | | Micronique | | Video game |
| Le Donjon hanté | | Algorithme | 1984 | Video game |
| Life | | Interact Electronics | 1980 | Video game |
| Logicase | Attro-Logic | Interact Electronics | 1980 | Video game |
| Mangeur d'Étoiles | | Micronique | | Video game |
| Manoir d'Alba, Le | | Micronique | | Video game |
| Mega Volts | | Interact Electronics | 1982 | Video game |
| Mega Volts II | | Interact Electronics | 1983 | Video game |
| Micro Chess | | Micro-Ware / Interact Electronics | 1978 | Video game |
| Micro Dico | | Micronique | | Utility |
| Micro Yatse | | Micronique | | Video game |
| Minor | | Micronique | | Video game |
| Montlhéry | | Micronique | | Video game |
| Morse Code Trainer | | Interact Electronics | 1981 | Utility |
| Mots et Chiffres | | Micronique | | Utility |
| Mur de Briques, Le | Breakthrough | Interact Electronics | 1978 | Video game |
| Mysterious Mansion Adventure, The | | Micro Video | 1982 | Video game |
| Ortographie | | Micronique | | Utility |
| Over Sea Aircraft Mission | | Micronique | | Video game |
| Pack Wars | | Interact Electronics | 1982 | Video game |
| Packrat Multimaze Overlay | | Interact Electronics | 1981 | Video game |
| Parsec | | Algorithme | | Video game |
| Participe Passé | | Micronique | | Utility |
| Pendu, Le | Hang-Man | Interact Electronics | 1978 | Video game |
| Pengo | | Micronique | | Video game |
| Pesée | | Micronique | | Utility |
| Piège, Le | | Algorithme | | Video game |
| Piranhas | Vicious Fishes | Algorithme | 1982 | Video game |
| Poker Elan | | Micronique | | Video game |
| Poursuite | | Algorithme | | Video game |
| Questions Réponses | | Micronique | | Utility |
| R-Bert | | Micronique | 1984 | Video game |
| Raid | | Micronique | | Video game |
| Régates | Regatta | Interact Electronics | 1978 | Video game |
| Régions Françaises, Les | | Micronique | | Utility |
| Relatifs | | Micronique | | Utility |
| Relations | | Micronique | | Utility |
| Reversi - Othello | Reversi | Interact Electronics | 1979 | Video game |
| Safecracker | | Interact Electronics | 1982 | Video game |
| Scola-Quest | | Micronique | | Video game |
| Sous-marin | Depth Charge | Interact Electronics | 1981 | Video game |
| Space Opéra | | Micronique | | Video game |
| Spéculation | | Micronique | | Video game |
| Speed Reader | | Interact Electronics | 1981 | Utility |
| Star Track | | Interact Electronics | 1979 | Video game |
| Stramble | | Micronique | | Video game |
| Strip 21 | | Micronique | | Video game |
| Sub Search | | Interact Electronics | 1982 | Video game |
| Superbowl | Football | Interact Electronics | 1980 | Video game |
| Tic Tac Math | | Micronique | | Video game |
| Tirages | | Micronique | | Utility |
| Touch Down!! | | Micro Video | 1979 | Video game |
| Tour de France en Avion, Le | | Micronique | | Utility |
| Toute la Conjugaison | | Micronique | | Utility |
| Trail Blazers | Encirclement | Interact Electronics | 1978 | Video game |
| Turbo | | Micronique | | Video game |
| Vautours | | Micronique | | Video game |
| Video Chess | | Interact Electronics | 1978 | Video game |
| Videograph | | Micronique | | Utility |
| Volleyball | | Interact Electronics | 1978 | Video game |
| Zarcos | | Micronique | | Video game |
