= Memotech =

British computer company in the 1980s

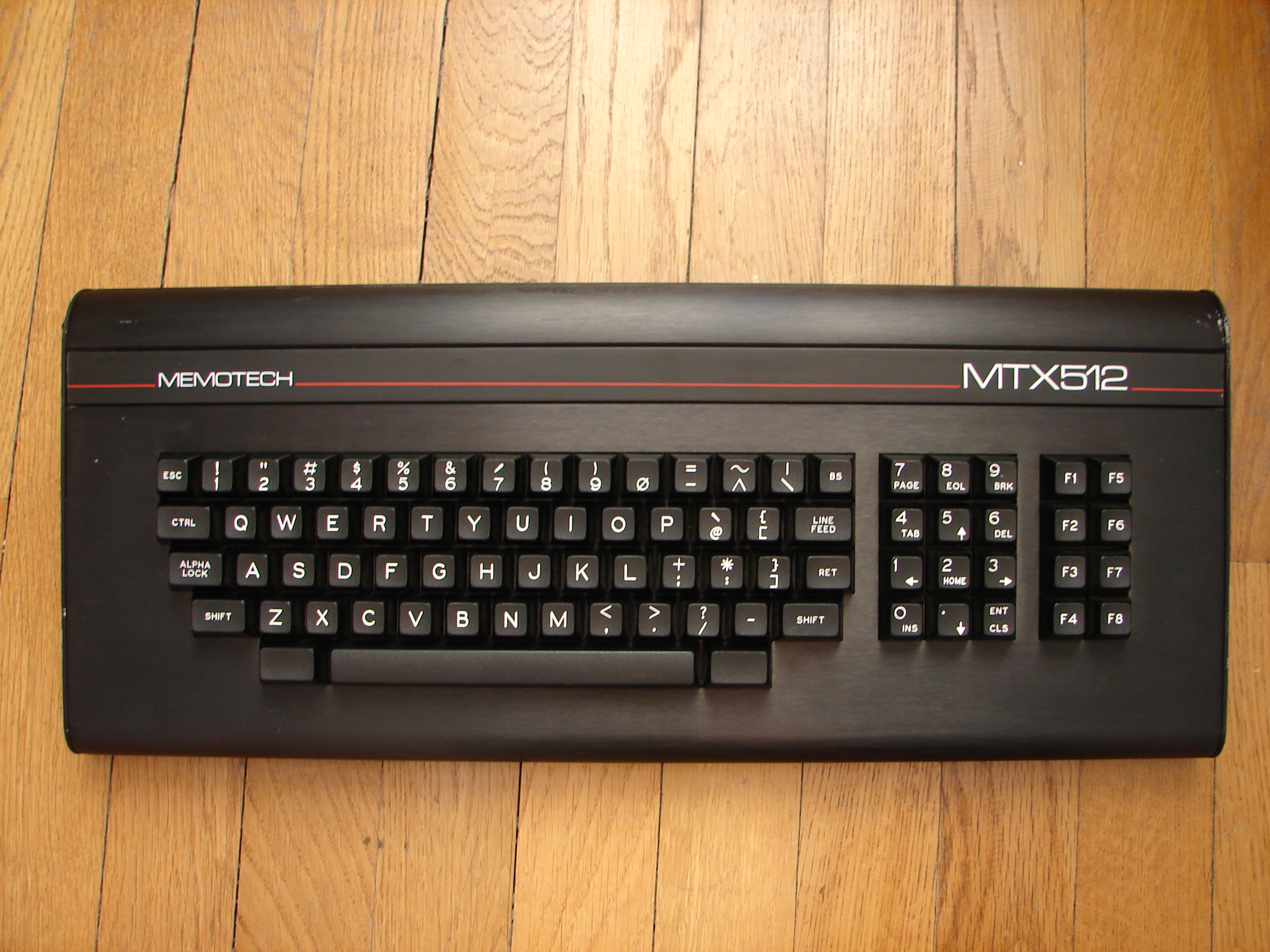
Memotech MTX512 computer

Memotech Limited was a British computer company founded by Geoff Boyd and Robert Branton in Witney in Oxfordshire, England. They started out during the early 1980s producing memory expansion packs ("RAMpacks") and other hardware expansions for the Sinclair ZX81. However, they eventually went on to develop and sell their own MTX family of computers in 1983. The range included the following models: MTX500, MTX512 and RS128. The MTX 512 was based on the Zilog Z80 processor. Although well-regarded, these computers were not commercially successful, and the company went into receivership in 1985.

== History ==
In 1984, the Norwegian company Norbit Elektronikk Norge A/S run by A. S. Fiko developed a complete Input/Output (I/O) control system with 4× 16-bits by using the blue Memotech 8-bit Dual in-line package DIL socket for I/O controls. The socket was located on the computer motherboard. Norbit Elektronikk used their Super ToolBox system and was able to use 16-bits by adding two data blocks of 8 bits at the same time. Digital I/O ports, Analog-to-digital converter and Digital-to-analog converter with all kinds of sensor systems for robotics and controls were developed. The control system was designed for the same aluminum casing as the main MTX512 unit.

In 1984/85 Memotech was working on a huge project to deliver the CP/M-based MTX512 together with the FDX and the control unit from Norbit Elektronikk to 64,000 schools in the USSR with the potential to sell about 200,000 units. The USSR was at that time under embargo by the United States, and companies were not allowed to deliver the new IBM Personal Computer with MS-DOS to the USSR. CP/M computers were not included in the Soviet embargo blockage and Memotech's MTX512 was therefore a good option.

Memotech went into receivership in 1985. A contributing factor, beyond the poor commercial success of the MTX, was the substantial investment Memotech made in preparing the MTX512 for the Soviet deal. This required a red brushed aluminum case instead of the black (made at a factory in the Netherlands), Russian BASIC, Russian character encoding, Russian keyboard and Russian documentation. Memotech worked with a professor at University of Oxford for the internationalization.

The Soviet government was also evaluating computer systems from other home computer manufacturers. Memotech was relying on the British government for funding the project, but ultimately, they only received about £1m and did not receive the full funding required. As a result, Memotech required cash payments from the USSR prior to supplying the 64,000 computers. The Soviets decided against this cash deal and instead agreed to acquire MSX computers from Yamaha (another later big deal was with Daewoo) with bartering mainly in steel and oil. Only a few thousand MSX computers were supplied to USSR schools and other educational institutions before the deal went dead. The main reason was the USSR thought that MSX's MSX-DOS was a new Microsoft operating system.

Since Memotech lost the deal to the USSR, and they had invested all their money in the project, money that was borrowed from the banks, plus the £1m funding from the UK government, Memotech went bankrupt. Some of the Memotech inventions still lived on, as several employees took some of Memotech's new video editing systems for televisions back to the USA. As a result of Memotech's bankruptcy, the UK government stopped funding to all computer manufacturers in the UK at that time, including Sinclair, Acorn and Apricot.

Memotech demonstrated a high-resolution frame grabber or "image processor" to journalists in 1984, described as acquiring digital images that were "nearly photographic in quality and detail". Pricing for this product was reported as around $14,000 when converted to US dollars.

== Successors ==
Robert Branton had left the company in 1985 as the financial situation deteriorated and when Memotech Limited folded, Geoff Boyd acquired the assets of the old company and re-launched the company as Memotech Computers Limited in February 1986. Boyd continued to market and support the MTX500, MTX512 and RS128 with the final MTX computer, the MTX512S2 being released late in 1986.
