= Cyphernetics =

Timesharing company (1969–1975)

Cyphernetics Corporation
- Industry: Timesharing
- Founded: 1969; 56 years ago
- Defunct: 1975; 50 years ago
- Fate: Acquired by Automatic Data Processing

Cyphernetics Corporation was a commercial timesharing company founded in March 1969 and based in Ann Arbor, Michigan. The company had a sales offices in most major American cities and many international locations, providing communications and technical support for clients.

As was the case with a number of commercial timesharing operators in the 1970s, Cyphernetics utilized the DECsystem-10 computer systems from Digital Equipment Corporation. Cyphernetics developed many products that were well ahead of their time, and whose concepts are contained in many of the most important PC applications, even today. Cyphernetics had an email system (called UTI:MEMO) in the early 1970s, as well as word processing (Cyphertext), spreadsheets (Cyphertab), project management, and time series data storage and analysis (TSAM). Despite comparatively weak CPUs, very limited memory and storage, and slow communications networks of the time, most modern PC applications were functional on the timesharing network at 300 to 1200 baud while running on a processor (that was much less powerful than a desktop PC is today) shared by over 50 simultaneous users.

Cyphernetics was purchased by Automatic Data Processing in 1975 and renamed ADP Network Services.
