= Richard Altwasser =

British engineer and inventor

Richard Francis Altwasser
- Born: 1957
- Citizenship: British
- Education: Degree in Engineering (Trinity College, Cambridge)
- Engineering career
- Employer: Sinclair Research (1980-1982)
- Significant design: ZX Spectrum's graphics mode

Richard Francis Altwasser is a British engineer and inventor, responsible for the hardware design of the ZX Spectrum.

== Biography ==
Altwasser graduated at Trinity College, Cambridge, with a degree in engineering in June 1978. He was hired by Sinclair Research in September 1980. His first assigned job was to write some programs to demonstrate the capabilities of the new 8 kB ROM and 16 kB RAM expansion for the ZX80. After that, he worked on the printed circuit board of the ZX81.

After the launch of the ZX81, Altwasser was promoted to the computer's development team and worked on the development of the ZX Spectrum, from the early technical discussions at the end of July 1981. His main contribution was the design of the graphics mode using less than 7 kilobytes of memory. He also participated in the preliminary stages of the development of the ZX Microdrive.

Altwasser left Sinclair at the beginning of May 1982 to establish his own company, along with Steve Vickers, author of the Spectrum's ROM firmware and manual. Provisionally called Rainbow Computing Co., the company later became Jupiter Cantab Limited.

Jupiter Cantab launched only one major product, a home computer called the Jupiter Ace. The Ace was a failure both in the UK and in the U.S. markets. In 1983 "Buyers Guide Home Computing Weekly" was advertising the ZX81 for £39.95, and the Jupiter Ace for £89.95. The company went bankrupt in November 1983.

In 1986 Altwasser became the engineering director at Amstrad. The same year Amstrad, already itself a successful home computer manufacturer, bought Sinclair Research's computer business. Altwasser left Amstrad in 1992, taking on a number of director and executive jobs in other companies, such as Network Development Manager at RM plc from September 2000 to May 2003. As of 2011 he gives his occupation as a reader at Portishead parish.
