= Computer liquidator =

A computer liquidator buys computer technology and related equipment that is no longer required by one company, and resells ("flips") it to another company. Computer liquidators are agents that act in the computer recycling, or electronic recycling, business.

There are several reasons why companies will sell, or liquidate, used Information Technology (I.T.) equipment: bankruptcy, downsizing and expanding, or technological advancement. Technological advancement is the most common reason, as the equipment is no longer performing the tasks required of it, usually because it has been rendered obsolete by more advanced technology coming on to the market. This used or obsolete technology is often referred to as electronic waste. Equipment designated as outdated for one company is still viable for another company, whose operations may not require advanced solutions. Often, an information technology audit will be performed to help a company decide if their equipment needs updating, and if so, what the requirements are.

== Reasons for liquidation ==
Computer liquidation is a sustainable solution and is environmentally friendly. Rapid technology change, low initial cost, and planned obsolescence have resulted in a fast-growing surplus of computers and other electronic components around the globe. The purpose of computer liquidators is to keep as many computers and electronic parts out of landfills. As newer and better technology replaces hardware at an ever-increasing speed, the amount of technical trash increases as the technology is being replaced. The speed at which hardware changes and innovates in the last few years follows, to some degree, Moore's law. Predictions were made that every landfill would soon be overflowing with discarded computer screens and computers, along with associated equipment such as keyboards and mouses and all the other hardware associated with use of the Internet. Most electronic waste is sent to landfills or incinerated, which releases toxic materials such as lead, mercury, or cadmium into the soil, groundwater, and atmosphere, thus having a negative impact on the environment. The best liquidating companies have clearly outlined policies regarding the disposal of dangerous substances which are often an issue with information technology.

The act of liquidation avoids the possible toxins and pollution that comes with putting electronic waste in landfills and also avoids the extra costs that go into recycling. For example, New York passed a law in 2015 that banned putting electronic devices in landfills. Now waste facilities in rural counties are being forced to either turn people away or eat the cost of recycling cathode ray tubes. Outside New York City, counties are spending from $6 million to $10 million a year to deal with the problem, according to Stephen Acquario, executive director of the New York State Association of Counties. The option of liquidation actually incentivizes people to get rid of their electronic waste in a safer way, since recycling costs the owner money, so there are cases where people would rather throw it out to avoid the recycling fee.

Computer liquidators effectively create a secondary market to meet the demand of those who are looking for a cheaper solution and do not require cutting edge technology. The IT equipment being liquidated ranges from new technology to old technology. Because of the relatively lower price for secondary market equipment, some companies may even purchase tech devices from the secondary market to use as backups, stocking the equipment themselves preemptively so that a replacement is always on hand in the event of trouble. Product availability is also another reason for buyers to buy in this market. Manufacturers generally refresh their product line every 12 to 24 months, typically liquidating older products. But networking hardware can often see service lives of five years or more, and resellers and computer liquidators might carry products that are upwards of a decade old. End users that use a particular product may find it much easier and cheaper to add/replace an older device rather than take on the costs, business disruptions, and knowledge gaps that occur when upgrading to new products. When newer products are adopted, the used equipment is inevitably liquidated, thrown out or sold back, which creates a robust marketplace.

== Process ==
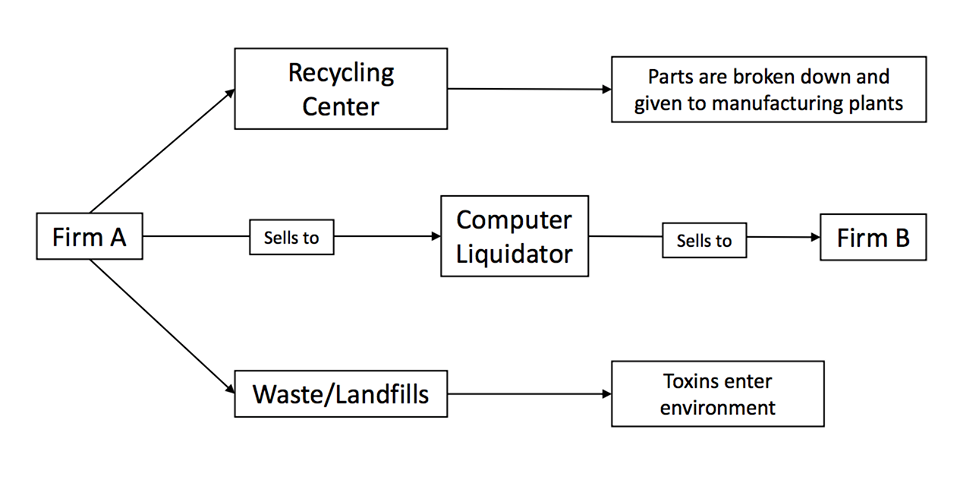
The Computer Liquidation Process

There are typically three agents in the computer liquidation process: the seller, the computer liquidator, and the buyer. The sellers are companies who are bankrupt and need to sell their assets, companies who are downsizing or expanding, and companies who are upgrading their technology. Usually, companies who are looking to sell their equipment will first conduct an information technology audit to review their systems and equipment. The process is generally fueled by the supply side, as computer liquidators rely on what is available on the market for them to liquidate and resell. Thus, there nearly always exists a shortage for buyers.

Oceantech, for example, buys up computers, laptops, tablets and other such electronics from companies who no longer need the technology. They then conduct certified data destruction on the appliances. Technicians will then perform a thorough check of the systems and confirm that the devices are functional then they are stored into a warehouse. If only certain parts, like the motherboard or hard drives, are able to be used, these are stripped off of the machine and put into a warehouse to store. Then, the devices or parts are resold to smaller companies and places like school districts, who are in need of these products. Most of the companies involved in the computer liquidation business are also heavily involved in the computer and electronic recycling industry which takes on a similar process of disassembling and testing.

This process theoretically benefits both ends of the exchange, the seller gets money for equipment they no longer needs and the buyer gets cheap equipment that is necessary for their work.

== Resources ==
A number of organizations have sprung up that provide technical guidelines to those handling or dealing in eWaste.
