= ADP (company) =

American software company

Automatic Data Processing, Inc.

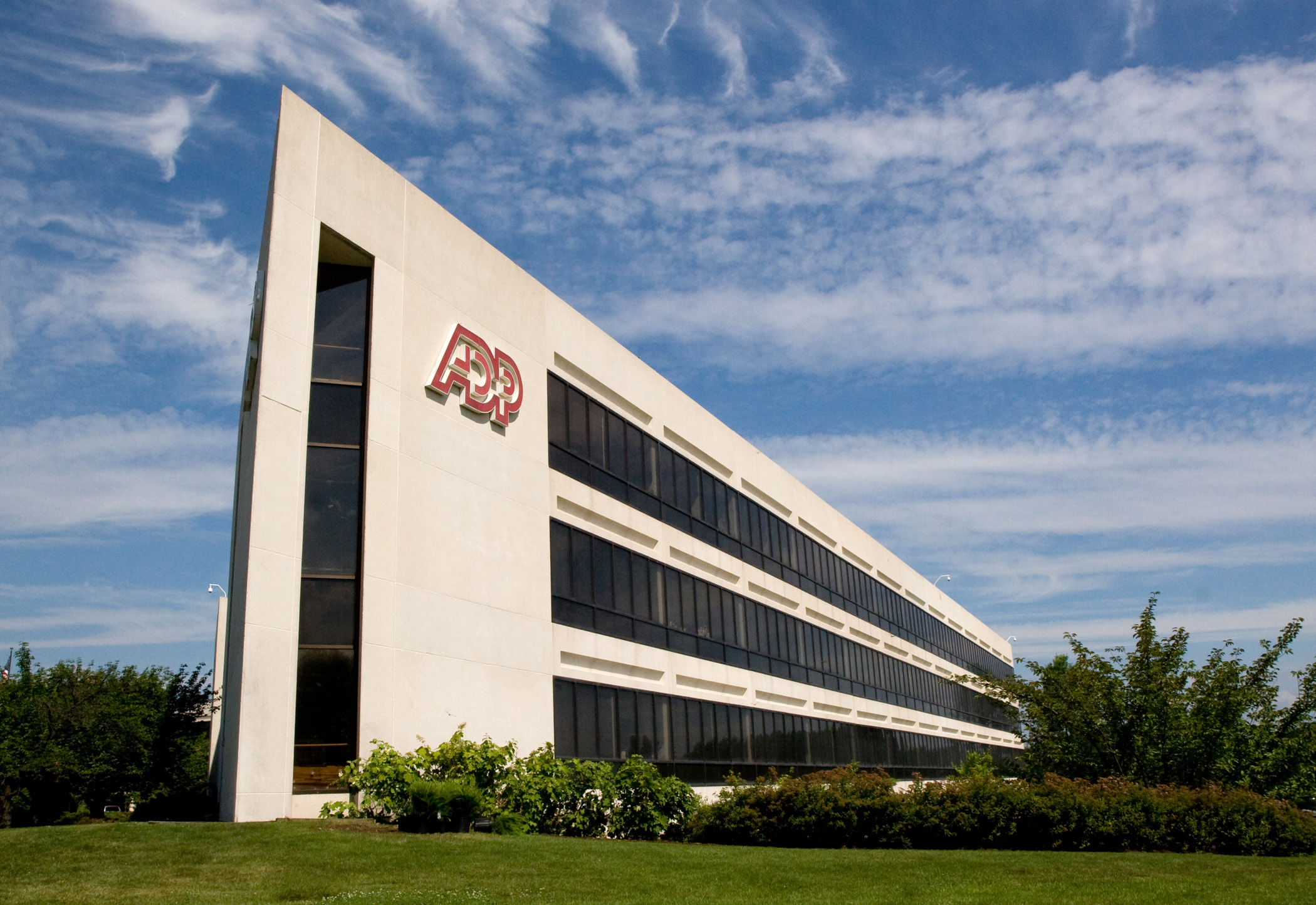
- Headquarters in Roseland, New Jersey
- Trade name: ADP
- Formerly: Automatic Payrolls, Inc.
- Type: Public
- Traded as: Nasdaq: ADP; Nasdaq-100 component; S&P 500 component
- Industry: Business services; Software
- Founded: 1949; 77 years ago (as Automatic Payrolls, Inc.); Paterson, New Jersey, U.S.
- Founder: Henry Taub
- Headquarters: Roseland, New Jersey, U.S.
- Key people: Maria Black (CEO); Joe DeSilva (COO); Samantha Orihuela (CMO); Peter Hadley (CFO)
- Services: Human resource, payroll, tax and benefits administration tools
- Revenue: ▲US$20.6 billion (2025)
- Operating income: ▲US$5.41 billion (2025)
- Net income: ▲US$4.08 billion (2025)
- Total assets: ▼US$53.4 billion (2025)
- Total equity: ▲US$6.19 billion (2025)
- Number of employees: c. 67,000 (2025)
- Website: adp.com
- Footnotes; Financials as of June 30, 2025.

Automatic Data Processing, Inc. (ADP) is an American multinational provider of cloud-based human resources management, payroll processing, and professional employer organization (PEO) services, headquartered in Roseland, New Jersey.

== History ==
In 1949, Henry Taub founded Automatic Payrolls, Inc. as a manual payroll processing company with his brother Joe Taub. Future United States Senator Frank Lautenberg joined the brothers in the company's infancy. In 1954, Lautenberg, after successfully serving in sales and marketing, became a full-fledged partner with the two brothers.

In 1957 the company installed a punched card system that would facilitate automatic data processing, replacing manual input calculators. The next year the company changed its name to Automatic Data Processing. In 1961, Oppenheimer & Company, one of ADP's clients, took the company public. At that time the company had 300 clients, 125 employees, and revenues of approximately US$400,000.

In 1962, ADP opened a Wall Street office to provide payroll and accounting services to brokerage firms. This office eventually expanded into ADP's brokerage service division, which was spun off into Broadridge Financial Solutions in 1997.

ADP established its dealer services business in 1973 after acquiring National Inventory Control System, a Portland-based inventory control service and data center, and CSI Computer Systems of Cincinnati. These moves extended ADP's reach into another industry-specific market, and the company later completed more than 30 dealer service acquisitions before spinning the division off into a separate company.

In 1975, Frank Lautenberg succeeded Henry Taub as CEO. By that time, ADP's annual revenue had grown to $150 million. ADP achieved growth during this period through horizontal acquisitions that allowed the company to reinforce its core service offerings while expanding geographically. The company acquired several time-sharing computer service companies during the 1970s, including the UK-based Time Sharing Limited (TSL) in 1974 and the Michigan-based Cyphernetics in 1975. These companies were folded into ADP Network Services, and allowed the company to continue its payroll processing transition from traditional batch-processing courier models toward remote mainframe access.

By 1981, ADP had approximately 100,000 clients and total annual revenues exceeding $500 million, making it the world's largest independent computer services company. At that time, ADP processed paychecks for five percent of the U.S. workforce.

In August 1996, ADP began acting as a professional employer organization (PEO) after acquiring Staff Management Systems of Tampa, Florida. On October 21, 2008, ADP switched its stock listing to the NASDAQ Global Select Market. In 2020, ADP was ranked 227 on the Fortune 500 list of the largest United States corporations by revenue. ADP has also been included on Fortune Magazine's "World's Most Admired Companies" List for 14 consecutive years and has earned recognition from DiversityInc as one of the top companies for diversity and inclusion in the United States for 11 consecutive years. ADP has about 67,000 employees worldwide and its fiscal year 2025 revenues were $20.6 billion.

=== Acquisitions ===
As ADP became a professional employer organization, it made several acquisitions. In 1995, the company acquired the German company Autonom and the payroll and human resource services company GSI, among others. In September 1998, ADP acquired UK-based Chessington Computer Centre that supplied administration services to the UK Government.

In 2006, ADP acquired Kerridge Computer Co. Ltd., a dealer management systems (DMS) provider to auto dealers, primarily in the UK. In 2007, the ADP Brokerage Service Group was spun off to form Broadridge Financial Solutions, Inc.

In January 2017, ADP acquired The Marcus Buckingham Company (TMBC). In October 2017, ADP acquired Global Cash Card, a digital payments facilitator. In January 2018, ADP acquired WorkMarket, a New York City–based software platform company that helps businesses manage freelancers, contractors, and consultants. Later that same year, the company announced the acquisition of Celergo, a global payroll management service company.

In 2023, ADP acquired workflow automation tool Sora. In October 2024, ADP acquired WorkForce Software, a management services provider.

== Divisions and spinoffs ==
=== Broadridge Financial Solutions ===
In 2007, the ADP Brokerage Service Group was spun off to form Broadridge Financial Solutions, Inc., removing about US$2 billion from ADP's total yearly revenue. ADP distributed one share of Broadridge common stock for every four shares of ADP common stock held by shareholders of record as of the close of business on March 23, 2007. ADP had originally purchased Brokerage Service Group in 1965.

=== CDK Global, LLC ===
Formerly called ADP Dealer Services, CDK Global was formed October 1, 2014, and provides technology services to automotive dealerships, as well as vehicle manufacturers. In 2010, ADP acquired the automotive marketing company Cobalt.

BZ Results, winner of AutoSuccess magazine's 2005 "Innovative Company of the Year" award, was purchased by ADP in 2006. At the time, BZ Results was valued at $125 million. On April 7, 2014, ADP laid off several Dealer Services associates in a reorganization and 3 days later announced plans to spin off the Dealer Services division as a standalone company. On August 19, 2014, ADP Dealer Services announced that the name of the new company, post-spinoff, would be CDK Global (an acronym for Cobalt, Dealer Services, Kerridge).

Both S&P and Moody's downgraded ADP to AA in April 2014, after the dealer services unit was spun off.

== Business model and operations ==
Automatic Data Processing provides human resource management software and services, including payroll, and operates with a recurring revenue business model. ADP operates through two business segments: employer services and professional employer organization. Key products include RUN Powered by ADP, an HR and payroll platform for small businesses, ADP Workforce Now, a human capital management (HCM) platform for mid-sized and large businesses, and ADP Lyric HCM, an enterprise HCM platform. ADP also issues the National Employment Report, which analyzes aggregated and anonymized payroll data from more than 26 million workers. The report is widely cited in economic reporting and analysis.

The company is headquartered in Roseland, New Jersey and operates in more than 140 countries and territories. ADP has expanded its international presence and extended its services through acquisitions.

Maria Black has served as CEO since 2023. As of 2025, the company was ranked 220 on the Fortune 500 list of the largest United States corporations by revenue, and had around 67,000 employees.

== Employment data ==
ADP has been used as a source of private-sector employment data. ADP's National Employment Report (NER) launches two days before the United States Bureau of Labor Statistics reports. In 2022, it was redesigned in collaboration with Stanford's Digital Economy Lab.

As early as 2018, the Federal Reserve used ADP employment and earnings data. In mid-2025, ADP stopped providing data to the Federal Reserve. That same year, ADP began issuing the NER Pulse, a weekly preliminary U.S. estimate of the ADP National Employment Report.
