= List of New York Institute of Technology alumni =

Logo of the New York Institute of Technology

The New York Institute of Technology (NYIT or New York Tech) is a private, not-for-profit, accredited, doctoral and research university. The university has several locations, including the main campuses in Long Island and New York City, and other campuses in Jonesboro, Arkansas, and Vancouver, Canada. The university was founded in 1955 and has graduated nearly 116,000 alumni, as of 2024. New York Tech alumni are distinguishing themselves in the fields of academics, architecture, arts, engineering, literature, medicine, science, business, entertainment, government, and law. The New York Tech alumni community spans the globe with nearly 116,000 alumni throughout the United States and in more than 110 countries as of 2024, and includes thousands of executive officers at multinational corporations, as well as over 9000 practicing medical doctors. New York Tech graduates also form the largest network of licensed architects in the New York metropolitan area. The following is a partial list of some notable alumni.

== Academia and administration ==
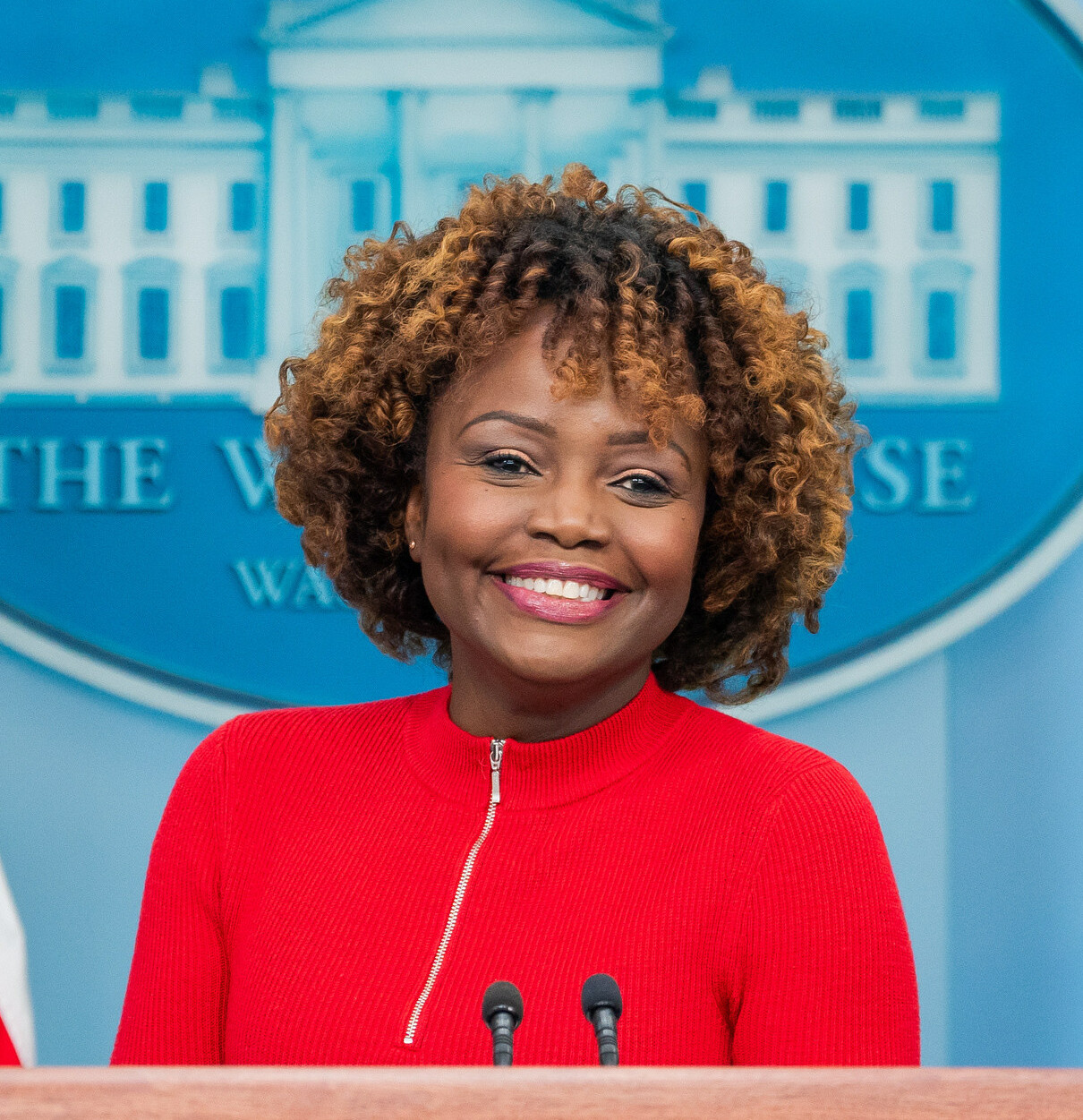
Alumna Karine Jean-Pierre was a lecturer in international and public affairs at Columbia University.

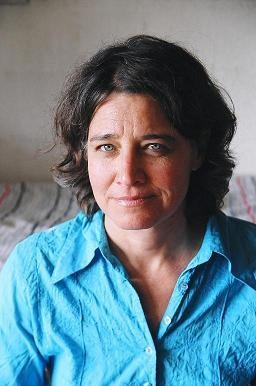
Alumna Yulie Cohen is a professor at the Bezalel Academy of Arts and Design.

- Kyriacos A. Athanasiou, chair of the Biomedical Engineering department at University of California, Davis
- Judith Barry, professor; director of the MIT Program in Art, Culture and Technology at the Massachusetts Institute of Technology; Guggenheim Award winner
- Sheena C. Howard, academic, author and producer; professor of communication at Rider University
- Frank LoVecchio, emergency medicine physician, medical toxicologist, academic and researcher; medical director of Clinical Research at College of Health Solutions of Arizona State University
- Jerry W. McDaniel, chair of the Communication Design Department at Fashion Institute of Technology; professor at Rhode Island School of Design
- Ken Pugh, professor in the Department of Pediatrics at Yale School of Medicine
- Donald E. Ross, president of Lynn University and founder and president of Wilmington University; in 2003–2004, the highest-paid college or university president in the US
- Jill Wruble, professor at Yale School of Medicine; retired from the United States Army with rank of major

== Arts, journalism and entertainment ==
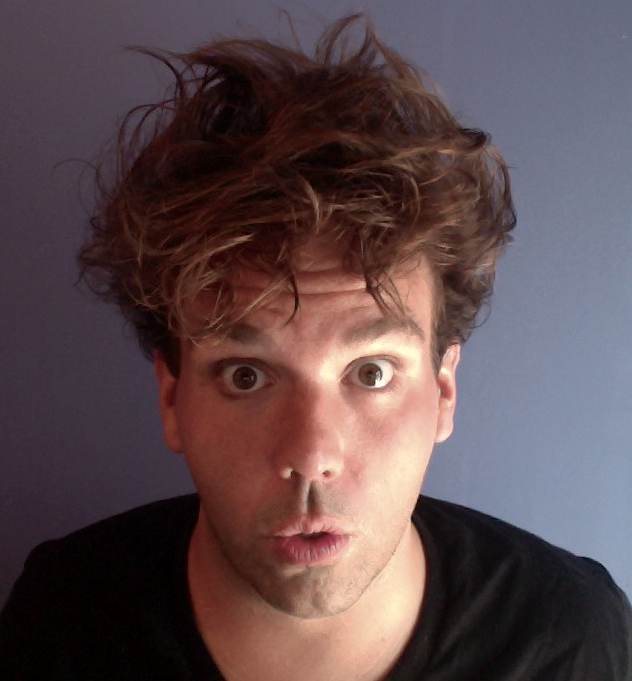
Alumnus Jake Sasseville was named by the White House as one of the top entrepreneurs in America in 2012.

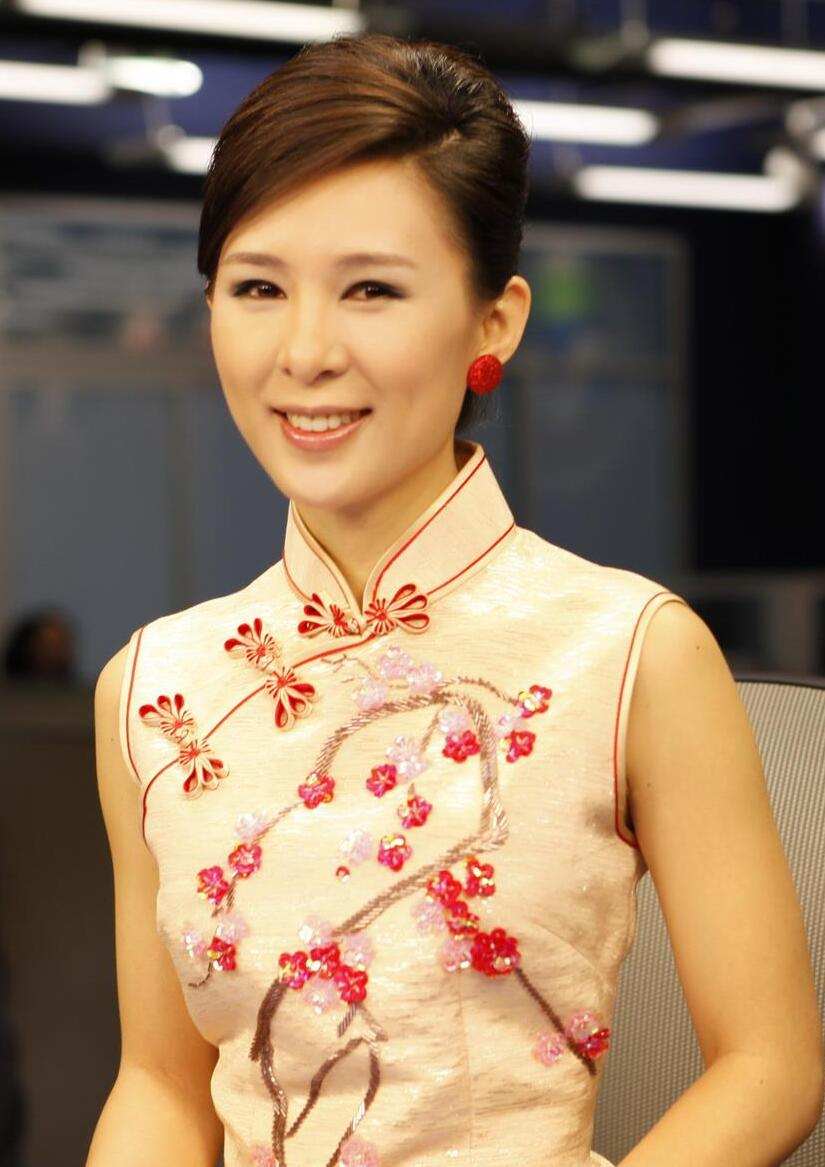
Alumna Lin Tan hosting the 2011 Chinese New Year Live show. She is also the host of SinoVision's evening talk show New York Lounge.

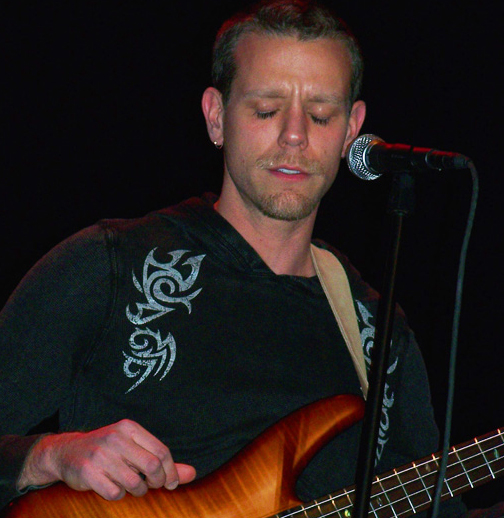
Alumnus Adam Pascal in concert in New Haven, Connecticut, January 19, 2008

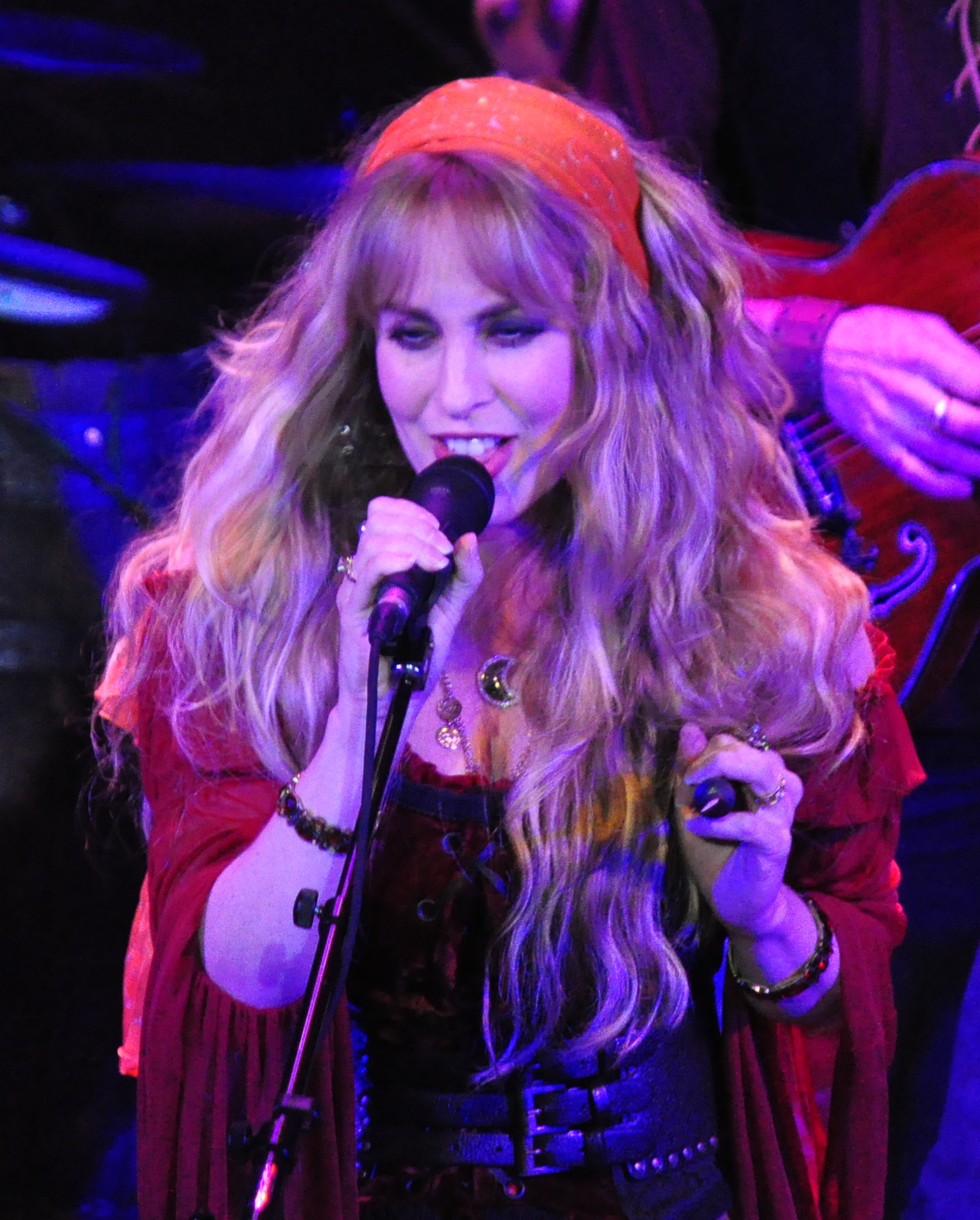
Alumna Candice Night in concert in 2012

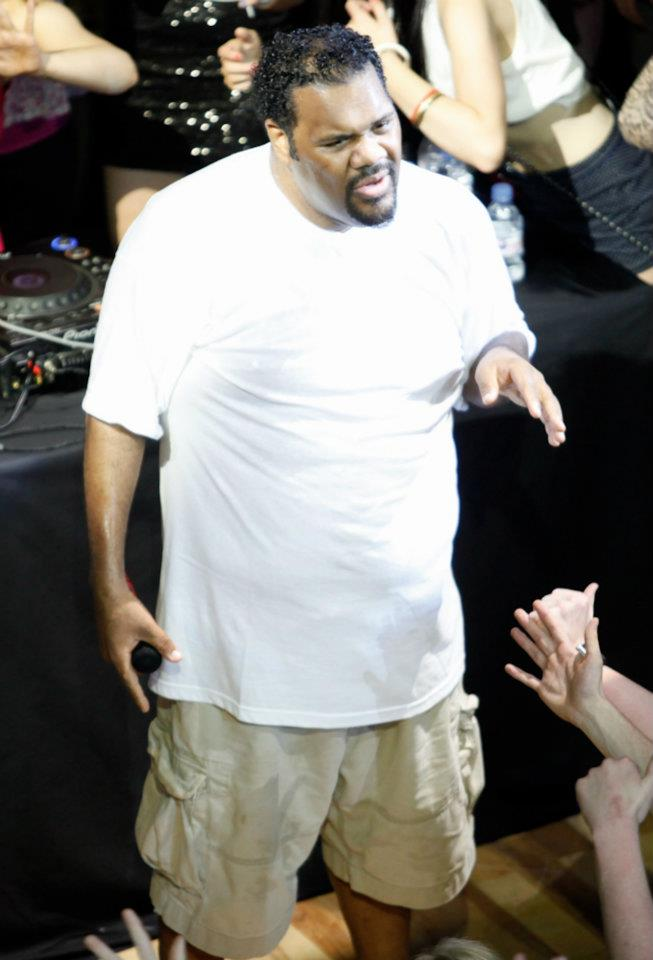
Alumnus Fatman Scoop performing in 2011

- Lori Bizzoco, writer, journalist, former public relations executive, founder and executive editor of CupidsPulse.com
- Patti Ann Browne, TV news anchor, Fox News
- Rob Cabitto, author, business owner, and public speaker
- Yulie Cohen, Israeli documentary filmmaker; professor at the Bezalel Academy of Arts and Design
- Jared Cohn, film director, screenwriter and actor
- Rik Cordero, music video, commercial, and film director
- Tony De Nonno, filmmaker, photographer, puppeteer, historian, and speaker in humanities
- Mansoor Al Dhaheri, Emirati film producer and entrepreneur
- Rahul Dholakia, Indian film director, producer, and screenwriter
- Chris Distefano, comedian and TV host
- Doug Draizin, film producer
- Nadine Ellis, actress
- Alphan Eşeli, Turkish director, screenwriter and photographer
- Jenni Farley, television personality
- John Fekner, artist
- Ben Finley, broadcast journalist, producer; editorial producer of Anderson Cooper 360; Emmy Award and four Peabody Awards
- Jim Geoghan, Emmy-nominated executive producer of the Disney Channel's The Suite Life on Deck and The Suite Life of Zack and Cody
- Isobella Jade, writer
- Joji
- Magic Juan, merengue and hip hop artist; lead singer and rapper of Dominican-American merengue group Proyecto Uno
- Kimmi Kappenberg, contestant on Survivor: The Australian Outback and Survivor: Cambodia
- Brian Kenny, ESPN SportsCenter anchor
- Art Klein, producer known for Bottle Shock, Nobel Son, and Marilyn Hotchkiss' Ballroom Dancing & Charm School
- Ameera Al-Kooheji, Bahraini TV presenter, video producer
- Odimumba Kwamdela, writer
- Susie Lewis, writer and producer who co-created the MTV animated series Daria
- Edna Machirori, Zimbabwean journalist; first black woman news editor in Zimbabwe, as news editor of The Chronicle, and the first black female editor of a mainstream Zimbabwean newspaper, as editor-in-chief of The Financial Gazette; won an IWMF Lifetime Achievement Award in 2013
- Seiko Mikami, artist
- Jonathan Monaghan, visual artist and animator
- Carrie Moyer, painter and writer
- Jill Nicolini, traffic reporter for The PIX Morning News in New York
- Candice Night, lead singer, Blackmore's Night
- Vithaya Pansringarm, Thai actor
- Adam Pascal, actor, singer, and producer; played Roger Davis in the Broadway musical Rent
- Dwayne Perkins, stand-up comedian
- Jamila Rowser, writer and publisher
- Sam Ryan, sportscaster
- Antonio Meneses Saillant, writer
- Jake Sasseville, television host, producer, writer, director and author
- Fatman Scoop, rapper, hype man, and radio personality
- Nada Shabout, art historian
- Tai Chih-yuan, Taiwanese comedian, actor, show host and YouTuber
- Tevin Thomas, musician, composer, keyboard artist, producer and educator

== Business ==
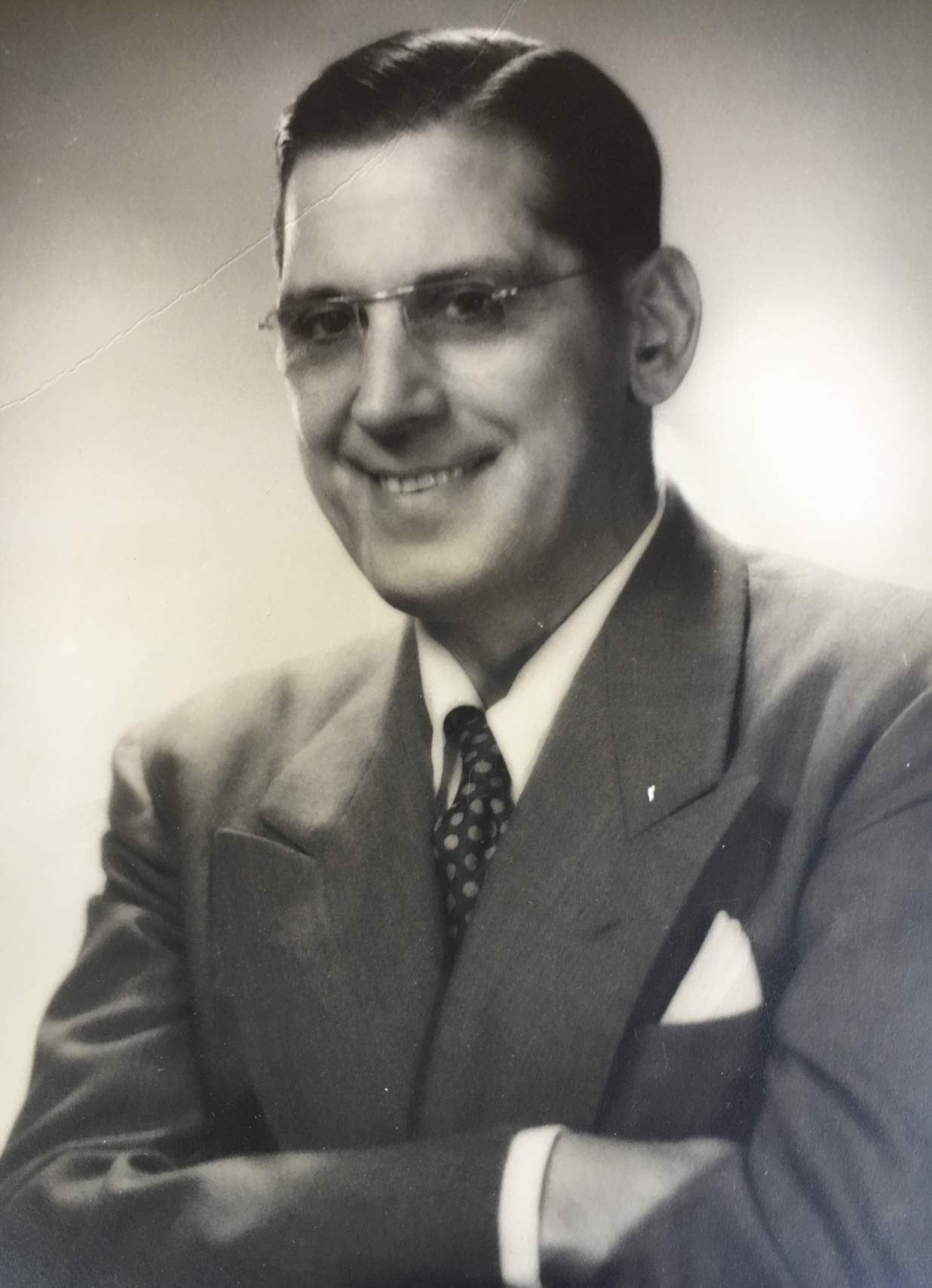
Alumnus John J. Flemm was an industrialist, politician, and Navy veteran who founded the Flemm Lead Company, one of the largest lead companies in the United States.

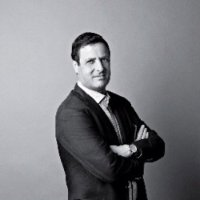
Alumnus Itzhak Fisher founded and served as CEO of RSL Communications, an over $1.5-billion telecommunications company with over 2,500 employees in 22 countries.

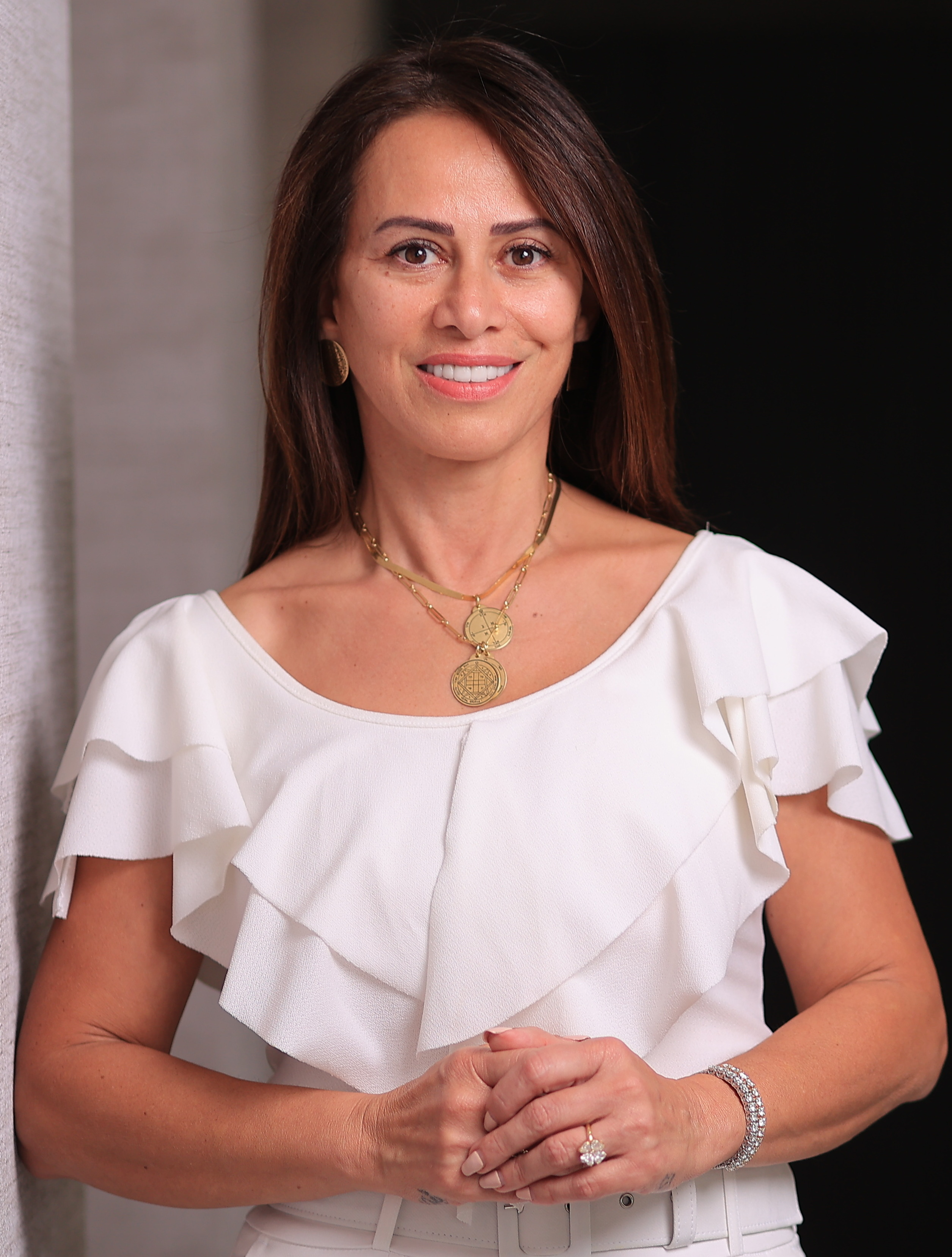
Alumna Iman Mutlaq is the founder and president of multinational financial companies; Sigma Investments Group and INGOT Group.

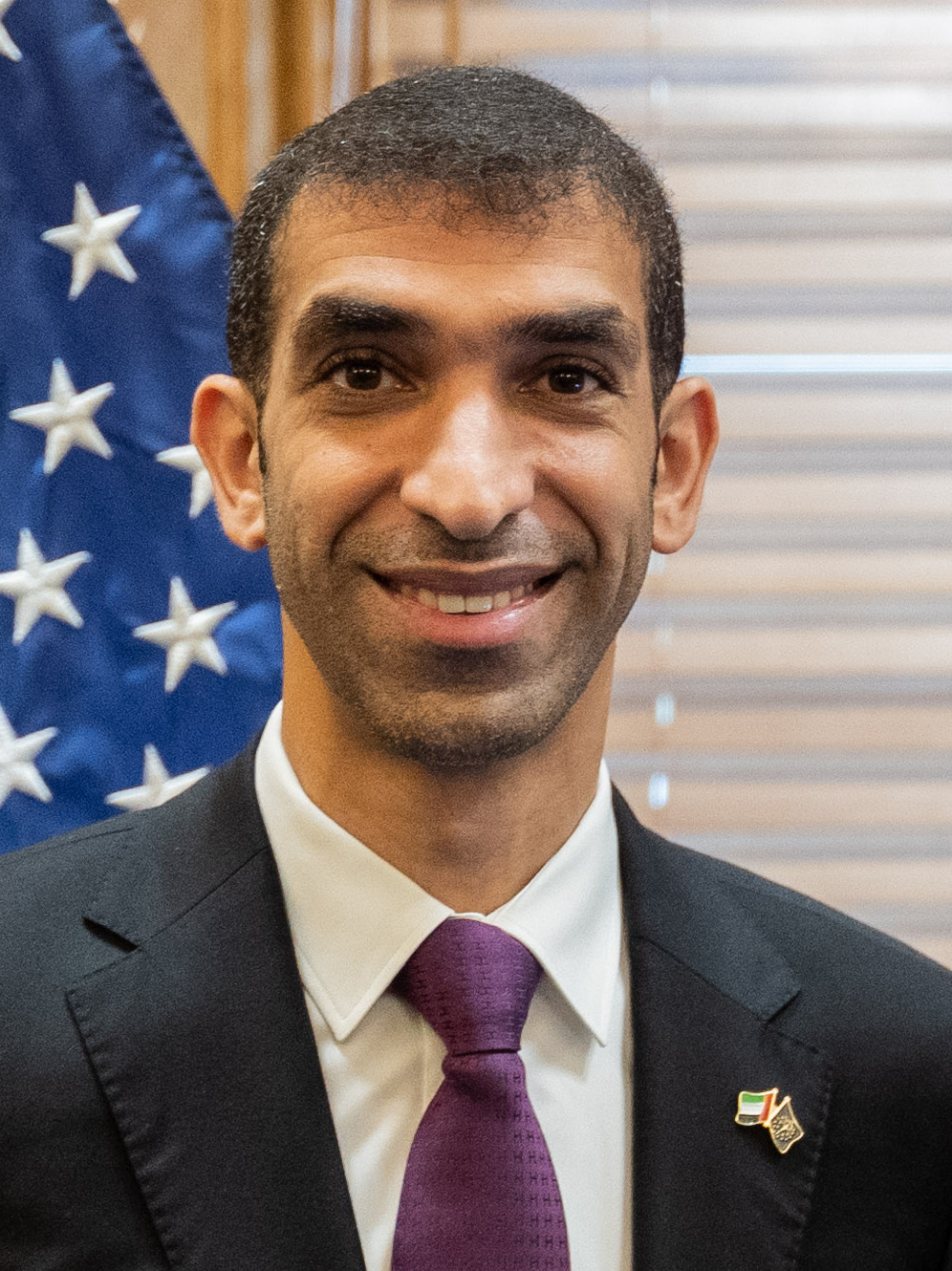
Alumnus Thani bin Ahmed Al Zeyoudi is the Minister of State for Foreign Trade of the United Arab Emirates.

- Nj Ayuk, executive chairman of the African Energy Chamber
- Matthew Calamari, business executive; chief operating officer of The Trump Organization
- James Chip Cleary, president and chief executive of the International Association of Amusement Parks and Attractions
- Richard J. Daly, CEO, Broadridge Financial Solutions
- Robert E. Evanson, president, McGraw-Hill
- Daisy Exposito-Ulla, former CEO, the Bravo Group Young & Rubicam
- Itzhak Fisher, vice president, Nielsen Holdings; founded and served as CEO of RSL Communications, a $1.5-billion telecommunications company
- John J. Flemm, founder and president of the Flemm Lead Company
- Alan Hilburg, trust communications and branding consultant
- Perry J. Kaufman, systematic trader, index developer, and quantitative financial theorist
- Iman Mutlaq, founder and president of Sigma Investments Group
- Chen Ningning, founder and president of Pioneer Metals Holdings Co., Ltd.; self-made billionaire; her net worth was $1.8 billion as of 2011
- Saifullah Paracha, business manager
- Monte N. Redman, CEO, Astoria Financial Corporation and Astoria Federal Savings & Loan Association
- Vincent L. Sadusky, former president and CEO of LIN Media, current chief executive officer at Univision Communications Inc
- Maria Sastre, businesswoman known for her work in airlines; first female regional vice president of United Airlines; Fortune named her one of the 50 most powerful Latinas of 2017
- Yaron Varsano, multimillionaire Israeli real estate developer; husband of actress Gal Gadot
- Eli Wachtel, managing director, Bear Stearns
- Bill Zerella, chief financial officer of Fitbit

== Government and civil service ==
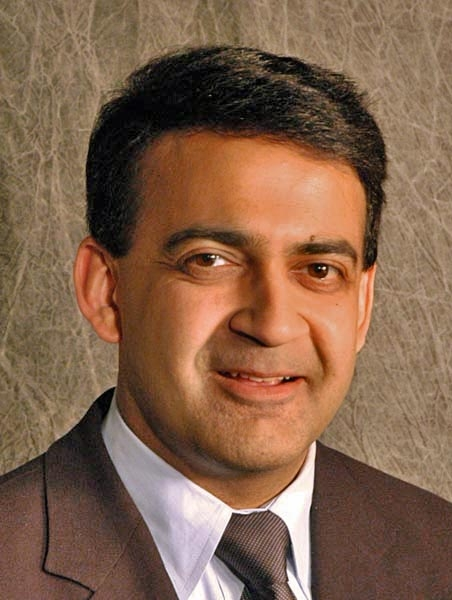
Alumnus Humayun Chaudhry, physician and CEO, Federation of State Medical Boards

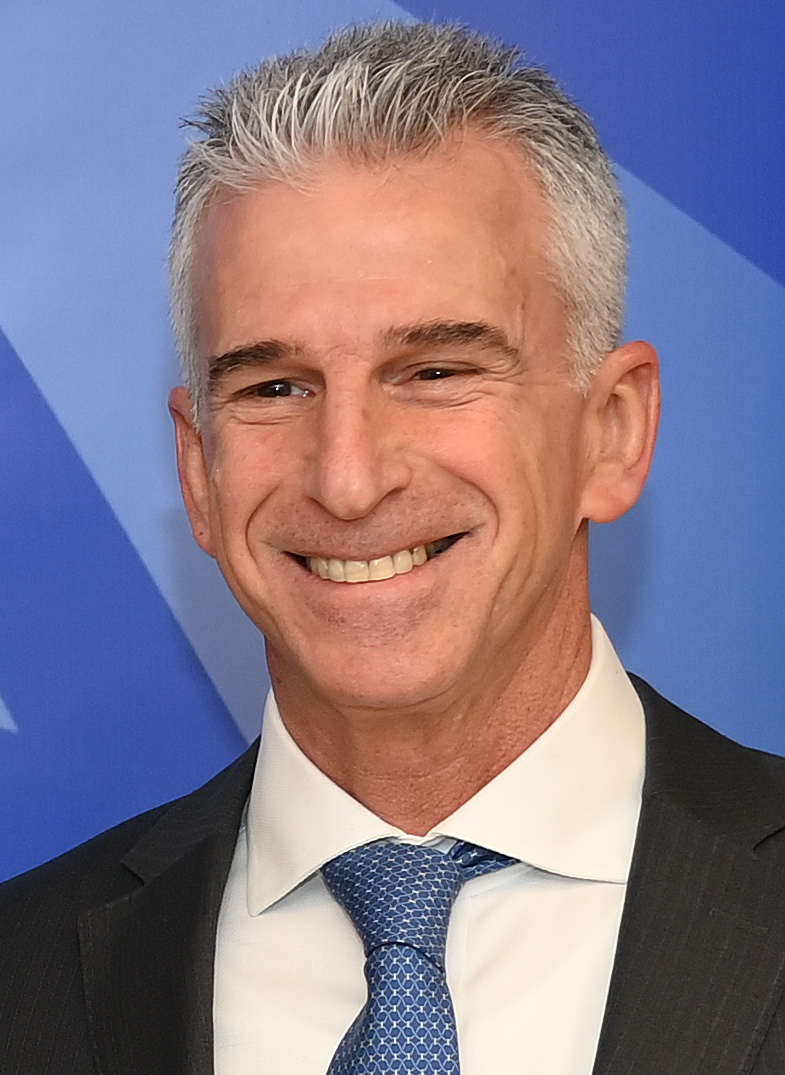
Alumnus David Barnea, current director of the Mossad

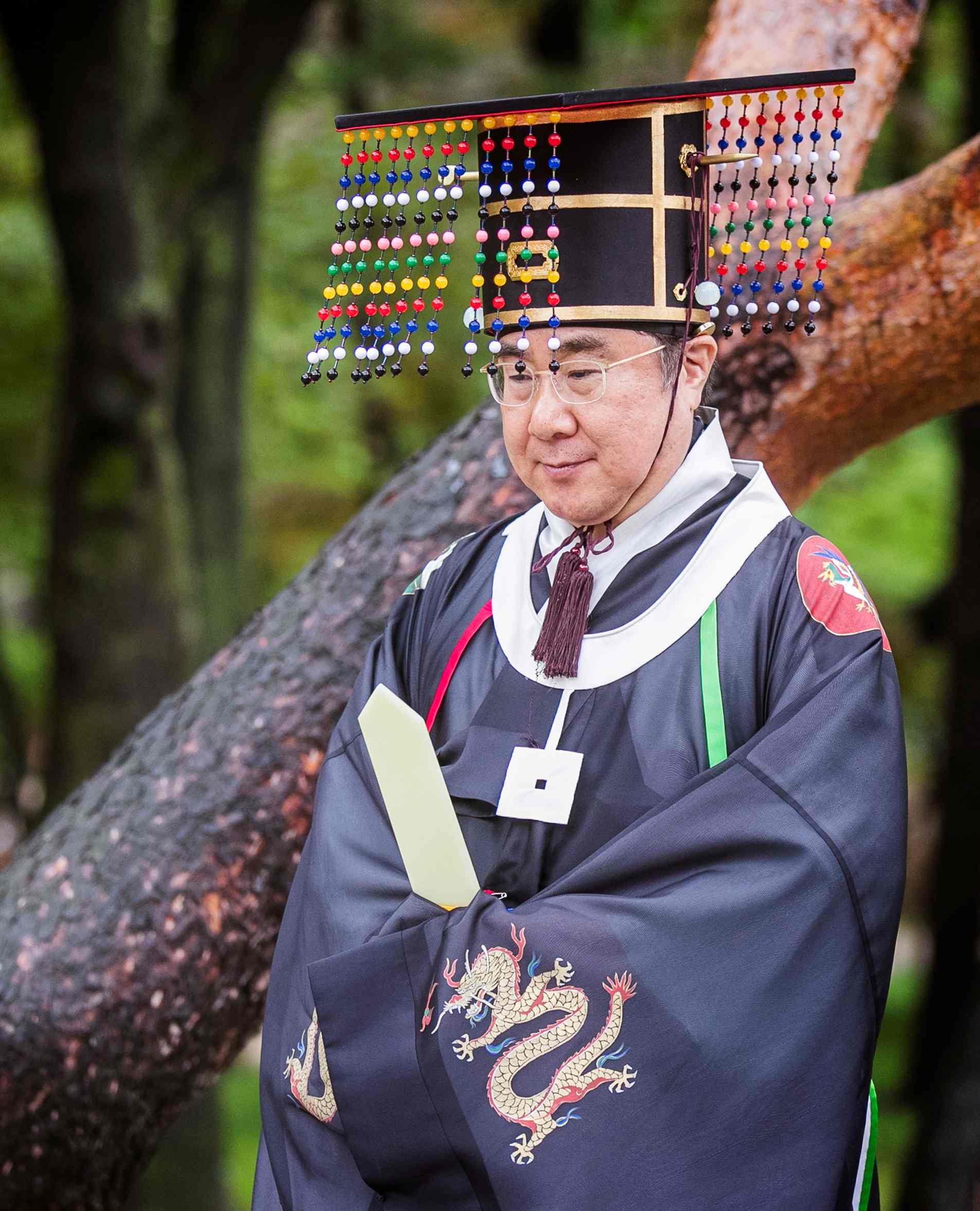
Alumnus Yi Won, incumbent director of the Jeonju Lee Royal Family Association

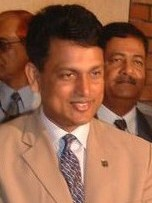
Alumnus A. N. M. Ehsanul Hoque Milan is a Bangladesh Nationalist Party politician, a former member of parliament from the Chandpur-1 constituency and the state minister of Ministry of Education. He also served as an adjunct lecturer at Brooklyn College and the Borough of Manhattan Community College.

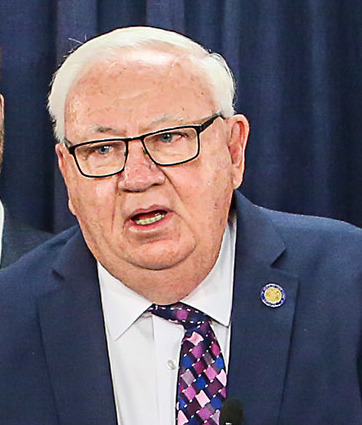
Alumnus John Brooks served as a Democratic member of the New York State Senate from the 8th district from 2017 to 2023.

- Thani Ahmed Alzeyoudi, former Minister of Climate Change and Environment for the United Arab Emirates; Minister of State for Foreign Trade of the United Arab Emirates
- David Barnea, director of the Mossad
- Abubakar Kabir Bichi, member of the Nigerian Federal House of Representatives
- John Brooks, served as a Democratic member of the New York State Senate from the 8th district 2017–2023
- Humayun Chaudhry, physician and CEO, Federation of State Medical Boards
- Golan Cipel, chief information officer at the Consulate General of Israel in New York
- Bill Clark, former New York Police Department detective, television writer and producer, winner of two Emmy Awards
- Nicholas Estavillo, NYPD chief of patrol
- Mohammed Ateeq Al-Falahi, secretary general of the Red Crescent Society of the United Arab Emirates
- Abdulla Bin Mohamed Bin Butti Al Hamed, chairman of the Department of Health in the Emirate of Abu Dhabi and a member of Abu Dhabi Executive Council
- Karine Jean-Pierre, White House Press Secretary, political campaign organizer, activist, political commentator, author, and lecturer in international and public affairs at Columbia University
- Brian M. McLaughlin, New York state assemblyman
- A. N. M. Ehsanul Hoque Milan, Bangladesh Nationalist Party politician, former member of parliament from the Chandpur-1 constituency and the state minister of Ministry of Education, adjunct lecturer at Brooklyn College and the Borough of Manhattan Community College
- Averof Neofytou, Cypriot politician; president of the then-ruling Democratic Rally (DISY) party 2013–2023; member of the House of Representatives since 2006
- Kevin O'Connor, physician and retired U.S. Army colonel serving as the physician to the president
- Andre Pierre, former Democratic mayor of North Miami, Florida; attorney
- Rafael Piñeiro, first deputy commissioner of the New York City Police Department (NYPD)
- Sowmya Reddy, general secretary of All India Mahila Congress of Karnataka and a member of the Indian National Congress
- Joseph Saladino, New York state assemblyman, 12th district
- Anthony Seminerio, politician
- Alonzo Short, retired United States Army lieutenant general who served as director of the Defense Information Systems Agency
- Sarahana Shrestha, Nepalese-American Democratic socialist politician and activist; member of the New York State Assembly, representing the New York's 103rd State Assembly district

== Military ==
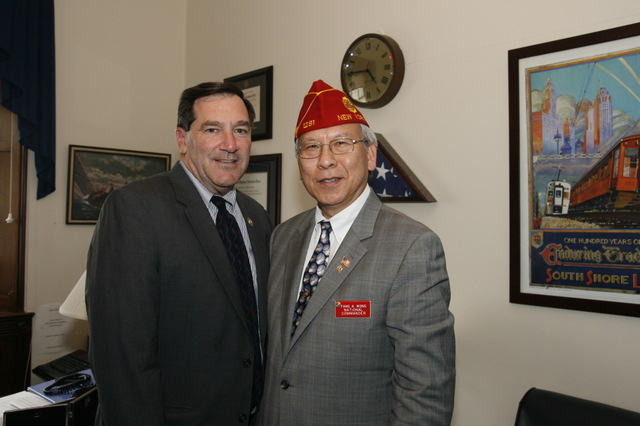
U.S. Rep. Joe Donnelly and alumnus Fang Wong, national commander of the American Legion

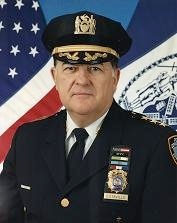
Alumnus Nicholas Estavillo, Combat Action Ribbon recipient

- Craig D. Button, US Air Force pilot
- Richard Jadick, naval surgeon credited for saving the lives of 30 marines and sailors during the Second Battle of Fallujah, earning him the Bronze Star
- Fang Wong, United States Army warrant officer who served as the National Commander of the American Legion, Bronze Star Medal recipient

== Royalty ==
- Abdulla Bin Mohamed Bin Butti Al Hamed, Emirati politician and sheikh; head of the National Media Office with the rank of minister since January 2024
- Queen Sylvia of Buganda
- Yi Won, incumbent director of the Jeonju Lee Royal Family Association of South Korea

== Science and related fields ==
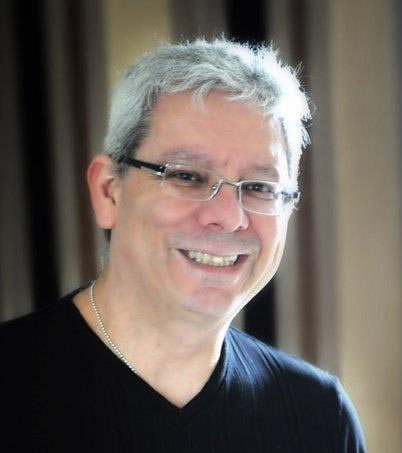
Alumnus Vincent Connare, Microsoft employee; creator of Comic Sans and Trebuchet MS fonts

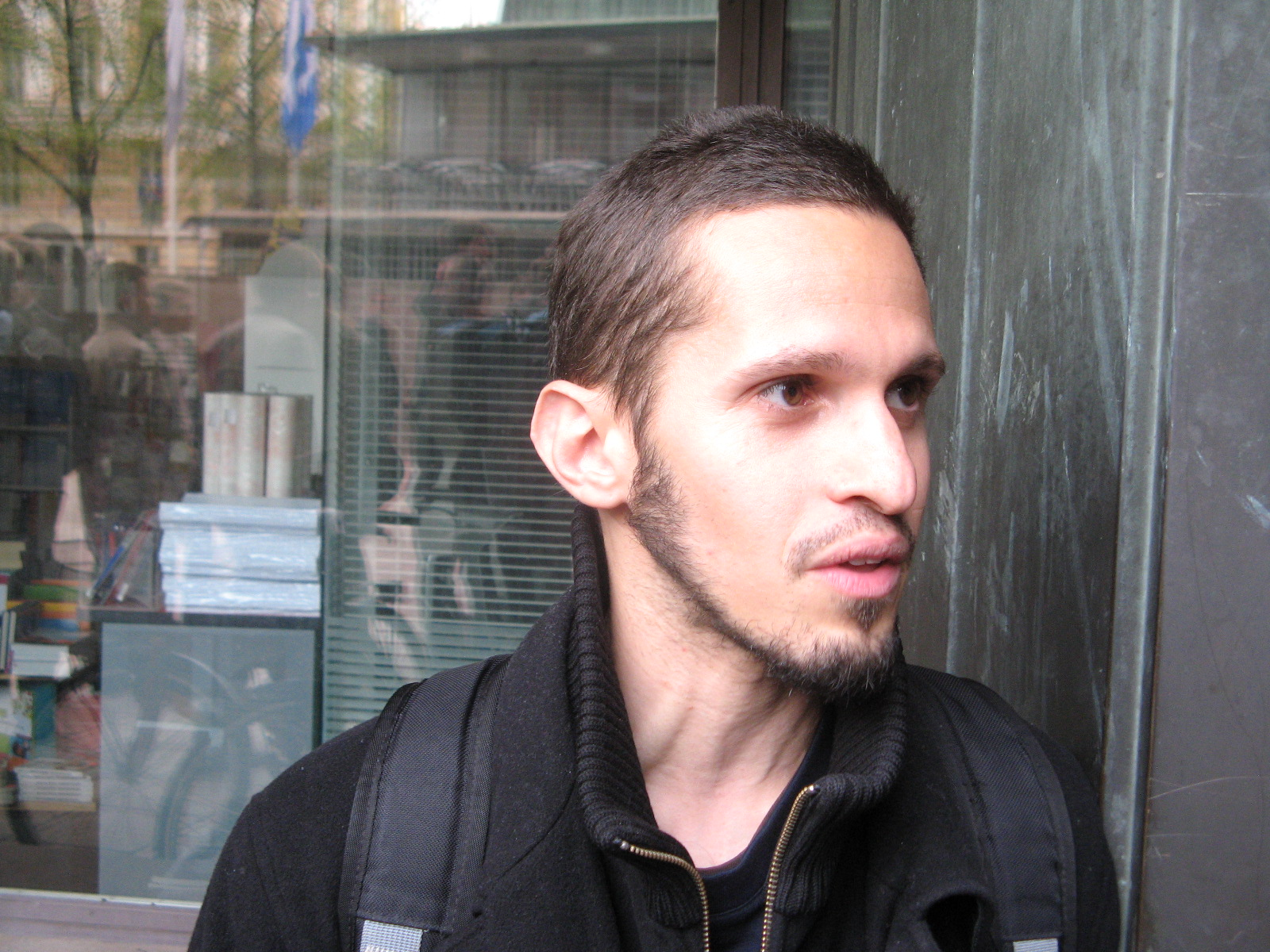
Alumnus Patri Friedman, software engineer at Google

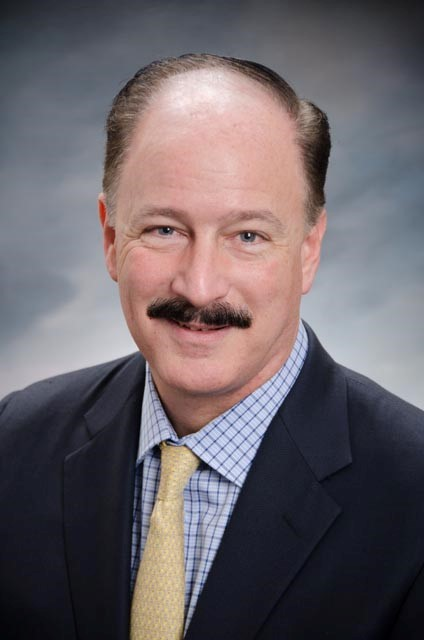
Alumnus Philip Fasano, executive vice president and chief information officer at American International Group

- Vincent Connare, font designer and former Microsoft employee; creator of Comic Sans and Trebuchet MS fonts
- Zhang Enhe, scientist, chief engineer of the Xian Y-7
- Patri Friedman, software engineer at Google
- Joseph Fuller, AIA, NCARB, New York area architect
- Pat Galloway, engineer, CEO of Nielsen-Wurster Group, first female president of ASCE (American Society of Civil Engineers), inducted into the National Academy of Construction
- Suresh Kumar, senior executive vice president and chief information officer for BNY Mellon
- Max Mermelstein, drug smuggler, worked as chief engineer for the Sheraton Hotel
- Ray Rayburn, fellow of Audio Engineering Society, audio systems engineer, digital audio designer for U.S. Senate
- Mikhail Varshavski, doctor, social media personality and philanthropist; People magazine named him the "Sexiest Doctor Alive"
- Steven Wolk, chief technology officer, P. C. Richard & Son
- Ben Wolo, director of engineering and operation at Qwest, managing director of LIBTELCO

== Sports ==
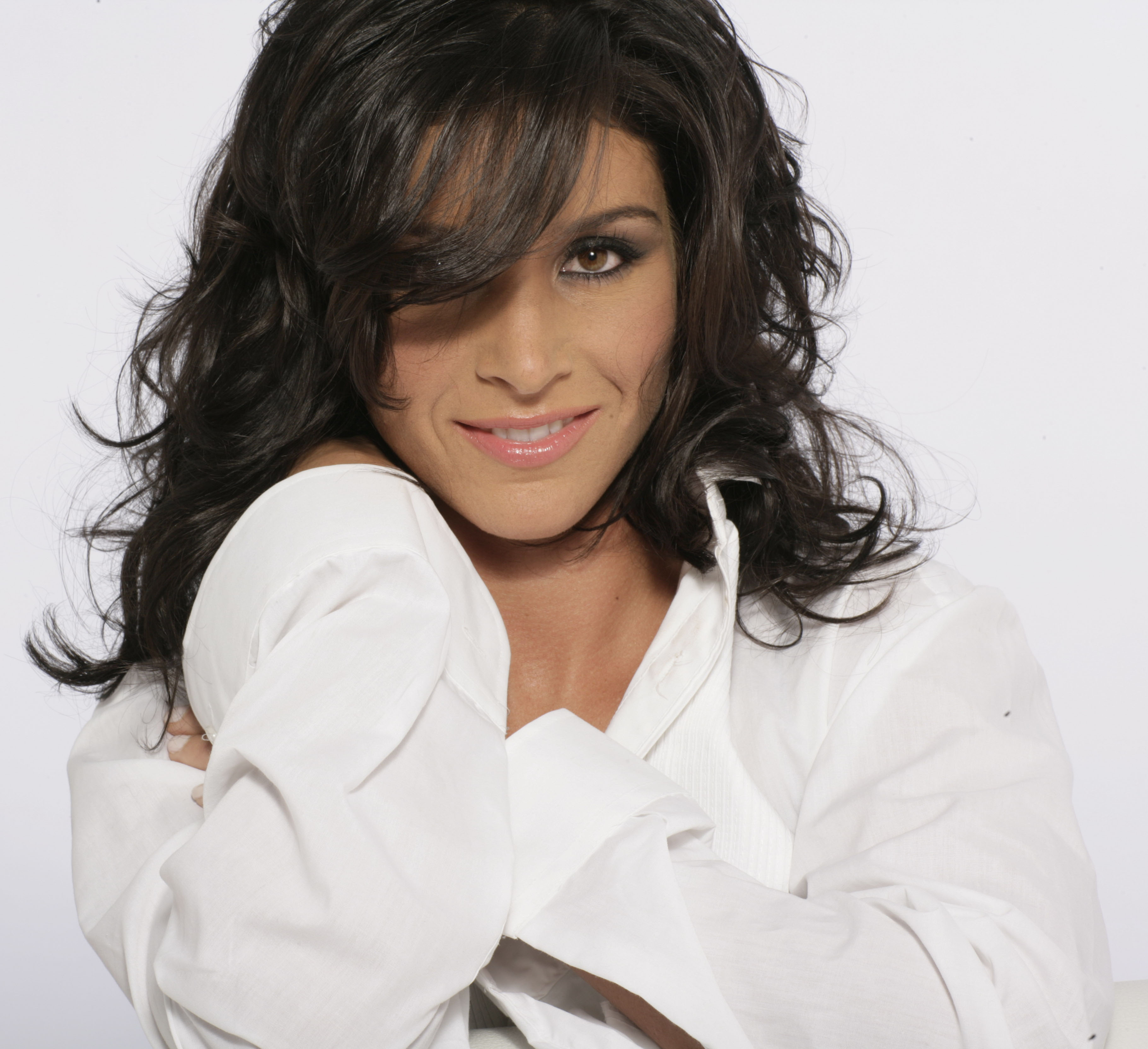
Alumna Allison Baver, short track speed skater and Olympic medalist

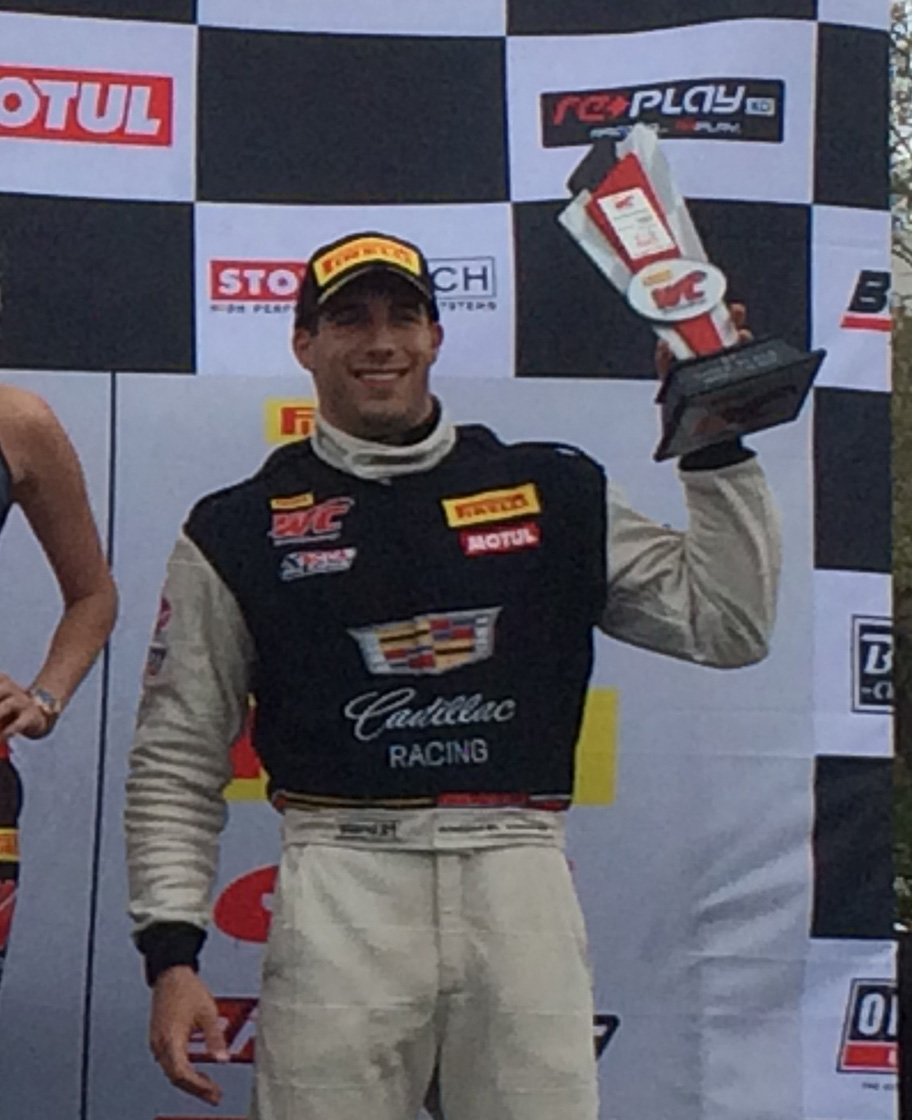
Alumnus Michael Cooper, race car driver who competes in the Pirelli World Challenge

NYIT has produced several Olympians. NYIT's track and field program alone has produced five Olympians. There have been at least 38 Major League Baseball drafted players from NYIT.

- Chris Algieri, professional boxer in the Light Welterweight division
- Mo'ath Alkhawaldeh, financial manager for Princeton University; Runner's World named him as one of the top 50 Most Influential People in Running worldwide; competed in the 2024 Olympics
- Manix Auriantal, professional basketball player
- Allison Baver, Olympic speed skating medalist (bronze, 2010)
- Brian Brady, former right fielder in Major League Baseball who played for the California Angels
- Howard Burnett, one-time Olympian, making his only appearance in 1988 (Seoul, South Korea), when he won the silver medal
- Evon Clarke, sprinter, competed in the 1992 Olympics
- Paston Coke, won the silver medal in the 400 metres at 1999 World Student Games with a personal record of 45.15 seconds
- Don Cooper, head pitching coach, Chicago White Sox
- Michael Cooper
- Vanessa Córdoba, Colombian footballer who plays as a goalkeeper for Beşiktaş
- Rade Džambić, Serbian former professional basketball player who last played for ZTE KK
- Jim Ferry, basketball coach
- Sarah Fisher, race car driver
- Ray Giannelli, baseball player
- Patrick Jarrett, represented Jamaica at the 2000 and 2004 Summer Olympics
- Gerry Lucey, Irish retired footballer and coach
- Hayden Smith, New York Jets player
- SonicFox, professional esports player
- Dave Telgheder, former Major League Baseball (MLB) pitcher who played for the New York Mets and Oakland Athletics 1993–1998
- Allen Watson, former Major League Baseball pitcher (member of 2000 World Series Champion New York Yankees)
- Wayne Watson

== Other ==
- Rex Heuermann, architect and expert in New York City's byzantine zoning codes; convicted serial killer
