= James Cleary =

James Cleary may refer to:

- James Vincent Cleary (1828–1898), Canadian Roman Catholic archbishop
- James W. Cleary (1927–2007), president of California State University, Northridge
- James Chip Cleary, head of the International Association of Amusement Parks and Attractions

== See also ==
- Jim Cleary (disambiguation)
