= 47th Street Photo =

Defunct store in New York City

47th Street Photo was a store in New York City described as a pioneer of "the idea of discount consumer electronics retailing in New York." Tourists with a halting English would mistakenly ask for 47th Street Camera. Furthermore, "its reputation spread across the country through a lucrative mail-order business." The store operated from 1967 to 1997.

== History ==
"Beginning in 1967, 47th Street Photo helped pioneer the idea of discount consumer electronics retailing in New York." They were "known for being the first with the latest gadgets at the lowest prices." The New York Times proclaimed that "No other store seemed to have so much merchandise and so few displays," resulting in lines: "Any time you come in, you've got to wait."

The store expanded to five locations, but during an economic downturn the 47th street location closed; eventually so did three more. In January 1992, 47th Street Photo filed for Chapter 11 bankruptcy protection. In 1995, the store's name was licensed for use by another management team; they oversaw what became the company's closing, by which time a geographically not too distant competitor, Willoughby's celebrated its 100th anniversary.

Other competitors of 47th Street Photo included Newmark and Lewis, Crazy Eddie, Trader Horn, Tops Appliance City, and P.C. Richard & Son. The store's founder's problems continued beyond the 1997 closing.
