= Newmark and Lewis =

Defunct American chain of discount stores

- Type: Public company
- Industry: Retail
- Founded: 1924 in Hicksville, New York
- Founders: Edward Newmark and Richard David Lewis
- Defunct: 1992
- Fate: Bankruptcy
- Headquarters: New York City, United States
- Number of locations: 79 (at peak)
- Key people: Richard “Dick” Lewis (Chairman and spokesperson)
- Products: consumer electronics

Newmark and Lewis (sometimes stylized Newmark & Lewis) was an American chain of consumer electronics stores described by The New York Times as an appliance-store chain that was closed in 1992.

It was founded by Edward Newmark and Richard David Lewis in 1924. Problems of the industry of which it was part included cutthroat price competition, which caused low profit margins, and slow consumer purchasing cycles, the latter because of "lack of fresh products." When it closed in 1992, it had 26 remaining stores, having earlier closed even more than that.

Described as "the New York area's biggest retailer of electronics and appliances" by a financial writer at The New York Times, the firm had been listed on the American Stock Exchange.

== History ==
Headquartered in Hicksville, Long Island, the chain was founded in 1924 by Edward Newmark and Richard David Lewis.

As part of their expansion they bought part of the 1947-founded Bernies TV & Appliances Co. in 1985.

Their 1980s growth was largely due to "the strength of new products like VCR's and microwave ovens that consumers could not seem to get enough of."

In 1991, Newmark & Lewis made a costly error when the chain decided to buy one of its competitors, the New Jersey–based Brick Church Electronics. Adding its fourteen stores to the Newmark & Lewis fold overextended the company's finances at a time where the country was in an economic recession, and in August of that year came a Chapter 11 bankruptcy filing. By the end of the year, a total of 41 stores were liquidated, and Newmark & Lewis announced 12 more closures in a December 31, 1991, press release. Approximately three weeks later, company president Ronald Fleisher went to the annual Consumer Electronics Show in Las Vegas hoping to find someone interested in buying the struggling chain of stores. When he returned to New York having been unsuccessful, Fleisher announced that Newmark & Lewis would be ceasing operations. Seven of the remaining 26 stores were closed immediately following the announcement on January 17, 1992; the remaining nineteen were liquidated and closed by the end of the month.

== Competitors ==
Among the many electronics chains Newmark and Lewis competed with were The Wiz, 47th Street Photo (1992), Crazy Eddie, Trader Horn, Tops Appliance City, and P.C. Richard & Son.

Company chairman Richard “Dick” Lewis became the chain’s spokesperson in the early 1980s. Newmark and Lewis would adopt the slogan “Dick Lewis is watching”, which was meant to highlight the stores’ desire to beat the competition by keeping an eye on the market and finding ways to pass the savings onto the customers, as well as providing excellent customer service; the idea was that Lewis would be looking out for these things.) The slogan was noted, semi-retired, and even lampooned.
