= Adventures in the Screen Trade =

1983 nonfiction book by William Goldman

- First edition
- Author: William Goldman
- Language: English
- Subjects: American film industry, screenwriting
- Genre: Essays
- Publisher: Warner Books
- Publication date: 1983
- Publication place: United States
- Pages: 418 (first edition)
- ISBN: 0446512737
- Followed by: Which Lie Did I Tell?

Adventures in the Screen Trade is a book about Hollywood written in 1983 by American novelist and screenwriter William Goldman. The title is a pun on Dylan Thomas's unfinished book Adventures in the Skin Trade.

== Overview ==
The book is divided into three parts. "Part One: Hollywood Realities" is a collection of essays on various subjects ranging from movie stars and studio executives to his thoughts on how to begin and end a screenplay and how to write for a movie star.

"Part Two: Adventures" has stories from 11 projects that Goldman has been involved with, from Charly and Masquerade, to Butch Cassidy and the Sundance Kid and All the President's Men, to some projects that remained unrealized, such as a musical remake of Grand Hotel.

In "Part Three: Da Vinci", Goldman shows the reader how he would go about adapting his own short story "Da Vinci" into a screenplay. The full text of "Da Vinci" and the subsequent screenplay that he wrote are included, followed by interviews with key movie industry figures, including director George Roy Hill, cinematographer Gordon Willis, and composer Dave Grusin.

There is also an expanded edition of the book, which includes the full screenplay of Butch Cassidy and the Sundance Kid, plus Goldman's analysis of the screenplay's strengths and weaknesses, as "Part Three", and moves the "Da Vinci" section to "Part Four".

== Background ==
In the late 1970s, Goldman did several hours of interviews with John Brady for a book that became The Craft of the Screenwriter (1981). Some of Goldman's answers were edited into a magazine piece for Esquire; this was read by an editor at a publishing house who contacted him about writing a book on screenwriting. Goldman agreed and hired Brady to work on the book with him, getting Brady to interview him over several sessions. These conversations were taped and transcribed, which Goldman used as the basis for the book.

== Reception ==
Adventures in the Screen Trade was a best-seller and has since become recognized as an industry classic. Film producer Art Kleiner wrote, "This is one of the three most engrossing 'creative confessional' books I've ever read."

== See also ==
- Which Lie Did I Tell?: More Adventures in the Screen Trade, Goldman's follow-up to Adventures in the Screen Trade.

== Notes ==
- Goldman, William (1989). Adventures in the Screen Trade: A Personal View of Hollywood and Screenwriting (reissue ed.). Grand Central Publishing. ISBN 0-446-39117-4.
- Goldman, William (1996). Adventures in the Screen Trade: A Personal View of Hollywood (2nd rev. ed.). Abacus. ISBN 0-349-10705-X.
- Egan, Sean, William Goldman: The Reluctant Storyteller, Bear Manor Media 2014
