= Ogutu Okudo =

Kenyan Oil and Energy Executive

- Born: 1992 (age 33–34); Kenya
- Education: United States International University Africa (Bachelor of Arts in International Relations); University of Aberdeen (Master of Science in Oil and Gas Enterprise Management)
- Occupations: Oil and gas executive, energy consultant
- Years active: 2017–present

Ogutu Okudo (born c. 1992) is a Kenyan oil and energy executive who served as a board director at the National Oil Corporation of Kenya. She is the founder and CEO of Guuru Energy. She has held leadership roles in global projects and played a significant role in various initiatives in Kenya, including drafting and implementing energy legislation, facilitating Kenya's first oil export, and representing stakeholders in major projects such as the international maritime boundary case at the ICJ. She is involved in deploying decentralized energy technologies in East Africa, including pay-as-you-go LPG cooking solutions and solar systems.

Okudo was the Kenya country manager for SpringRock Group, an African upstream oil development company headquartered in Lagos, Nigeria. She concurrently serves as an energy consultant to the Kenya's Ministry of Petroleum and Mining. She is the founder and CEO of the social enterprise Women in Energy and Extractives Africa (WEX Africa).

Okudo is a gender activist, author, speaker, and energy champion, acknowledged by Forbes' "30 Under 30" for her contributions to mentoring women and girls in STEM. CNN has recognized her as a disruptor in the energy sector.

== Early life and education ==
Okudo was born in Kenya circa 1992. She had her primary education in St. Nicholas School, Nairobi, then attended Rift Valley Academy in Kijabe. For the eight years spent at the American curricula school, Lucky was an avid basketball and football player. She later joined Rusinga Academy in Nairobi, where she served as a nominated special representative to the school council. In her commencement speech to the Class of 2020 for Rusinga Academy, Okudo reminisced on her time there.

Okudo was admitted to the United States International University Africa in Nairobi, where she graduated with a Bachelor of Arts degree in International Relations with distinction. During her studies, the announcement of the discovery of Kenya's first oil reserves propelled her to shift her focus from foreign policy and diplomacy, and enter the world of petroleum. She went on to study at the University of Aberdeen, in Scotland, where she graduated with a Master of Science degree in Oil and Gas Enterprise Management.

== Career ==
Okudo has been referred to by CNN as a woman on a mission to disrupt the oil and gas sector in Africa. In 2012, a year prior to Kenya discovering their first commercial viable oil deposits, she started Women in Oil and Gas East Africa (WIOGEA), which would later come to be known as Women in Energy and Extractives Africa (WEX Africa), This Nairobi-based non-government organisation had members in eight African countries, and over 3,500 members, 1,200 of whom were in Kenya, as of 2020. WEX Africa aims to bridge the gender gap in the energy and extractive sector. Members encourage girls to take science, technology, engineering and mathematics (STEM) courses and to seek careers in the lucrative male dominated sectors.

In 2017, Okudo became country manager for SpringRock Energy, an international oilfield and servicing company.

Okudo was a founding board member of the Association of Women in Extractives Kenya (AWEIK). Crans Montana Forum recognised her with the award of New Leader of Tomorrow, for her role in advocating for women in the energy sector. The Africa Youth Awards recognized her as one of the 100 Young Most Influential Africans. In 2020, Forbes Africa named her among the top 30 Africans under age 30.

In 2020, Okudo was appointed to the African Energy Chamber's highest-level advisory committee to serve on local content matters and support capacity building across the continent.

In 2020, she was recognized as Person of the Year by the Future Awards Africa for her work in the energy sector.
