= Bernie's =

American retail chain from 1947 to 2010

- Type: Private
- Industry: Retail
- Founded: Hartford, Connecticut, United States (1947)
- Founder: Bernard "Bernie" Rosenberg
- Defunct: Bankrupted February 28, 2010
- Headquarters: Enfield, Connecticut, United States
- Key people: Milton Rosenberg, President
- Products: appliances; televisions; bedding; electronics
- Website: None (was www.bernies.com)

Bernie's was a chain of American retail stores based in Enfield, Connecticut, operating locations throughout Connecticut, Massachusetts, and Rhode Island in the United States. At one time the company was owned by the now defunct Newmark and Lewis.

The chain declared bankruptcy on January 14, 2010 and liquidated all stores by February 28, 2010.

== History ==
=== Beginning ===
In 1947, Bernie's was founded by Bernard "Bernie" Rosenberg, an enterprising gas station owner. Bernie had many friends in the community and after the war, realized there was an opportunity to help people purchase their first television set. He initially sold televisions and radios from his gas station, but as customer demand increased Bernie found the need to expand. He opened his first showroom, Bernie's TV and Appliance, in Bloomfield, Connecticut in 1953.

Bernie, with the help of his son Milton and other family members, continued to grow and expand the business. Bernie Rosenberg died in 1988. Bernie's was, at one point, New England's largest family-owned Audio, Video, TV, Appliance and Bedding retailer. Bernie's son Milton Rosenberg was President upon the company's filing for bankruptcy.

=== Newmark & Lewis era ===
In 1985, the Rosenberg family sold its five Bernie's stores to Newmark & Lewis. Milton Rosenberg continued with Newmark & Lewis until 1990, when he left the company and bought House of TV in Springfield, MA. The Newmark & Lewis company went bankrupt and shut its doors in 1991. Rosenberg bought back the Bernie's name for $1 and opened a single store, capitalizing on the opportunity to rebuild his family's Bernie's chain.

=== Bernie's second life ===
By 1999, Milton had rebuilt Bernie's from 1 store into a 10 store chain, with locations in Connecticut, Massachusetts and Rhode Island. Bernie's was employing 457 employees and expected $140 million (~$242 million in 2024) in sales in 2000. The chain continued to grow, moving its headquarters and warehouse to Enfield, CT in 2004. By the end of 2009, there were 15 Bernie's stores.

=== Bankruptcy ===
Losses began to mount in 2008, when the 15-store chain had $125.4 million in sales and a loss of $234,154. The downturn in the economy was a contributing factor to declining sales and in 2009 sales had dropped 10.5 percent (to $112.2 million). Losses continued to grow, with 2009 losses of $1.9 million (~$2.69 million in 2024).

In late 2009, Rosenberg hired Altman and Co., a debt restructuring company from Stoughton, MA. Several options were explored for keeping the retail chain open, which included finding a buyer for the company or closing some of the under performing stores. Unfortunately, neither option proved viable. Bernie's was forced to file for bankruptcy on January 14, 2010. Bernie's nine Connecticut stores, one Rhode Island store and five Massachusetts stores were expected to close by the end of February 2010, after a liquidation sale run by Hilco.

Milton Rosenberg had been hailed for his efforts to protect the interests of his customers and 350 employees through the bankruptcy proceedings. Gift cards were honored and customer deposits returned (or redeemed for merchandise). Milton retained 100 percent of employees through the sale, until their locations were closed. Connecticut Attorney General Richard Blumenthal went on record to state how pleased he was "with Bernie's cooperative and caring spirit toward consumers."

During the bankruptcy proceedings, current and former employees were angered to discover the administrators of their 401(k) accounts withdrew funds to cover the termination and wind down of the 401(k) plans. For all active plans, 6% of the total value was withdrawn to cover costs. The matter was investigated by the Connecticut State Attorney General's office. Resolution to the matter is still pending.

In late February 2010, sources within the Bernie's chain reported Milton Rosenberg was interested in purchasing the Bernie's name and re-opening an appliance outlet store in Manchester, CT.

Liquidation sales at remaining Bernie's locations were completed on February 28, 2010. The final Bernie's locations closed their doors for good at 8pm ET.
