= Jim Cleary =

Jim Cleary may refer to:

- Jim Cleary (Australian footballer) (1914–1993), Australian rules footballer
- Jim Cleary (Northern Irish footballer) (born 1956), Northern Ireland international footballer
- Jim Cleary (hurler) (1889–1937), Irish hurler

== See also ==
- James Cleary
