= Egyptian Commodities Exchange =

Proposed commodities exchange in Egypt

- Type: Commodities exchange
- Location: Cairo, Egypt
- Owner: Egyptian government, Sigma Investments Group, INGOT Brokers and Sabika
- Key people: Egyptian government, Iman Mutlaq
- Currency: Egyptian pound
- Website: www.egycomex.com

The Egyptian Commodities Exchange (EGYCOMEX) is a proposed commodities exchange in Egypt.

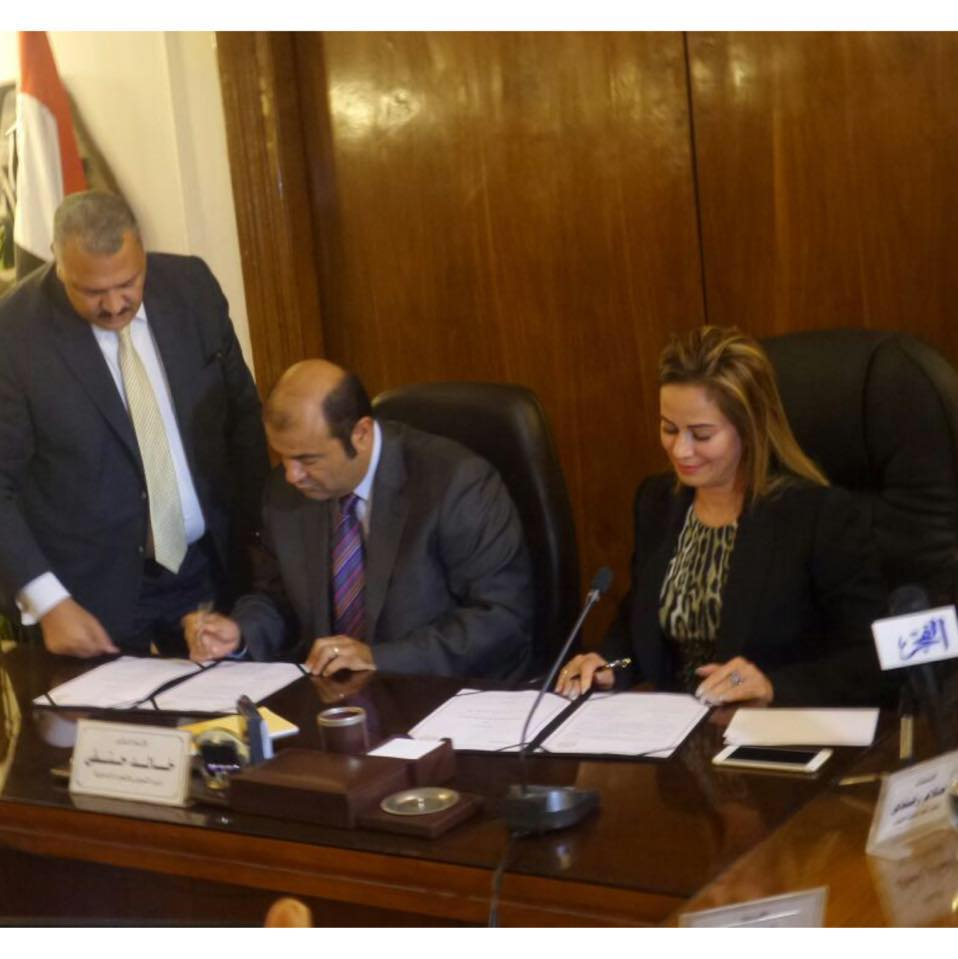
Khaled Hanafi, Egypt's Supply Minister and Iman Mutlaq(CEO of the Jordan-based Sigma Investments) on behalf of the consortium signs cooperation protocol to establish first ever electronic Egyptian Commodities Exchange in Egypt in November 2015.

A three-member consortium signed cooperation protocol with Egyptian government to establish a US$35–50m worth electronic Egyptian Commodities Exchange in Egypt as the first ever country in the MENA region; it will facilitate the well-being of the small farmers and supply of products at reasonable prices abolishing the monopoly of goods.

== See also ==
- Alternative Exchange
- List of futures exchanges
- List of stock exchanges
- List of African stock exchanges
