= Steven Wolk =

Chief technology officer

Steven Wolk is the chief technology officer of P. C. Richard & Son. He graduated from New York Institute of Technology with a B.S. in Computer Science.
