= Willoughby's =

Notable New York City-based camera store

Willoughby's Camera
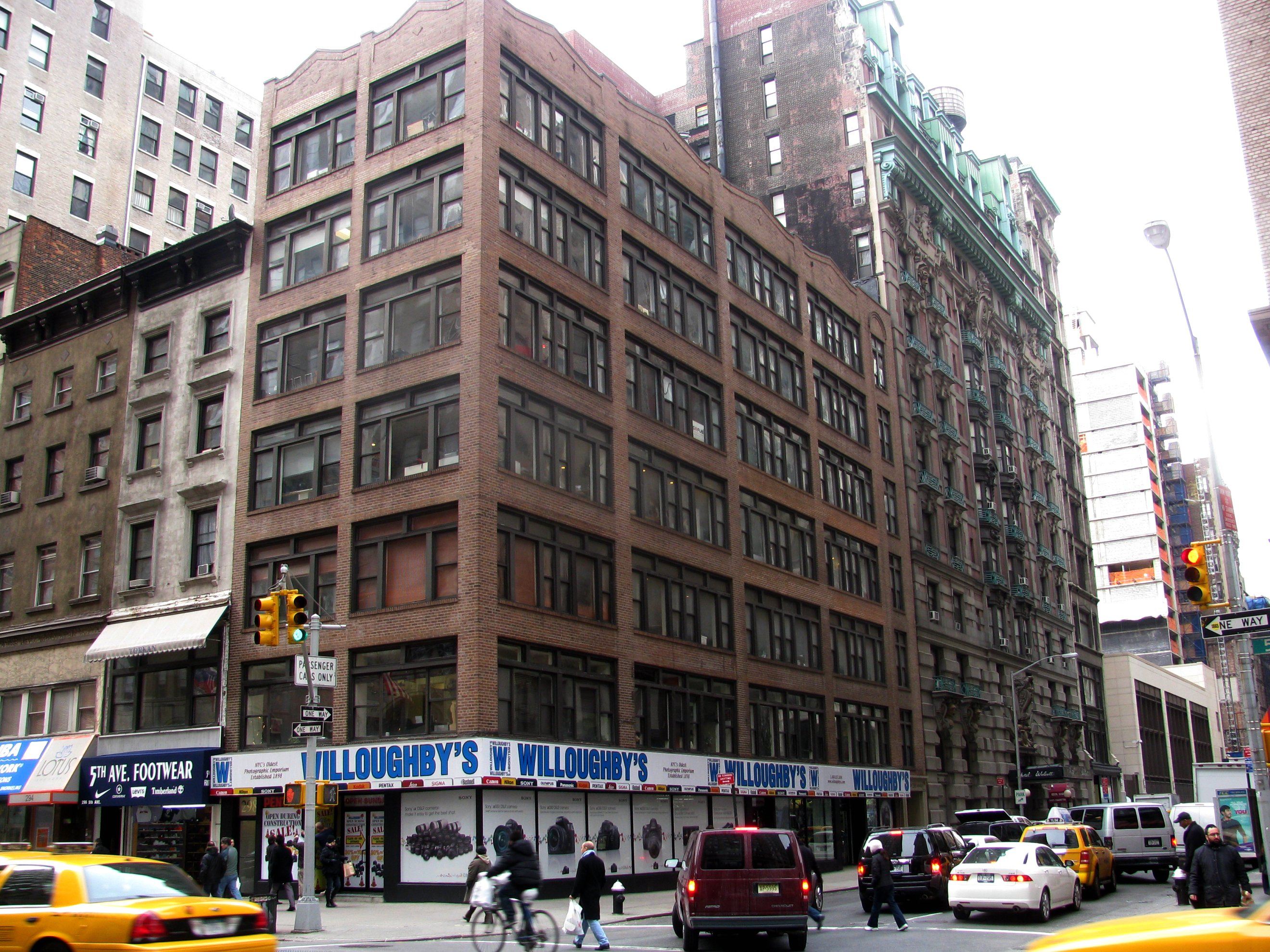
- The exterior of a former store on West 31st Street
- Type: Private
- Industry: Retail
- Founded: 1898; 128 years ago Manhattan, New York
- Founders: Charles G. Willoughby
- Headquarters: 15-17 West 36th Street, Manhattan, New York City; 40°45′11″N 73°59′47″W
- Number of locations: 1
- Products: Cameras, video, film, audio, computers, electronics
- Website: www.willoughbys.com

Willoughby's, which proclaims itself (the world's) Largest Camera (department) Store, was described in 1997 by The New York Times as "New York City's oldest camera store." It was founded by Charles G. Willoughby in 1898, By 1963 the store operated as Willoughby and Peerless Camera, and simply Willoughby-Peerless (without the word Camera) by 1992; by 2010 ownership had shifted, and the name once again was simply Willoughby's.

== Competition ==
For a while, the 1967-founded 47th Street Photo, about which tourists with a halting English would mistakenly ask for 47th Street Camera, was a geographically not too distant competitor, but 47th closed a year before Willoughby's celebrated its 100th anniversary.

Other areas in which the store competed were computers and other business machines, and a film lab.

== Ownership ==
Ownership of Willoughby's has always been private. In the over a century since its founding by Mr. Willoughby, including the period when one or more of "Peerless", "Camera", "Emporium" "Department" and "Store" were part of its name, it has been owned by various others. Most recently these have included:

- Erich Hirschfeld, who had formerly managed the business, purchased it in 1963
- Berkey, Inc., "which entered Chapter 11 bankruptcy proceedings" in 1988
- Queen Street Camera Inc., a Canadian firm that, eight years after its own founding acquired Willoughby's
- Jamie Ankari 1991-1997
- Joseph Douek
