= Billions at Play =

Book by Nj Ayuk

Billions at Play: The Future of African Energy and Doing Deals
- Author: Nj Ayuk
- Language: English
- Genre: Oil and gas
- Publisher: Made For Success Publishing; 2nd edition 2021
- Publication date: 2019; 2nd ed, 2021
- Publication place: America
- Media type: Print
- Pages: 230
- ISBN: 1913136345

Billions at Play: The Future of African Energy and Doing Deals is a book by Nj Ayuk, an attorney and entrepreneur. The book discusses the nature of African oil and gas where it highlighted the present situations and ways to developing and enhancing energy resources in African countries, expanding relationship and negotiation to other developed countries in the world. The book foreword was written by OPEC Secretary-General, H.E. Mohammad Sanusi Barkindo.

The book was published in 2019 and revised in 2021 as second edition (2nd ed). It has been published in French, Germany and Spanish.
