= Which Lie Did I Tell? =

Book by William Goldman

- First edition
- Author: William Goldman
- Language: English
- Publisher: Pantheon Books
- Publication date: 2000; 26 years ago
- Publication place: United States
- Pages: 485
- ISBN: 0-375-40349-3

Which Lie Did I Tell?: More Adventures in the Screen Trade is a work of non-fiction first published in 2000 by novelist and screenwriter William Goldman. It is the follow-up to his 1982 book Adventures in the Screen Trade.

Originally to be called The Big Campfire, the inspiration for the title came when Goldman was in the office of a Hollywood producer who was talking on the phone to one of his associates. Suddenly he cupped his hands over the receiver, snapped his fingers and said "Bill, Bill! Which lie did I tell?"

== Contents ==
The book begins with more stories about movies he has been involved with, starting with the period from 1982—when Adventures in the Screen Trade was published—to 1986 when he received no movie work. Goldman then tells the unfortunate story of how he became mixed up in the film adaptation of Memoirs of an Invisible Man, before the saving grace of The Princess Bride brought him his first screen credit in nearly nine years. Other adventures are Misery, The Year of the Comet (which he uses as an example of how a movie can become a failure at the script level), Maverick (which he uses as an example of the principle that the best scene sometimes needs to be cut), The Ghost and the Darkness (which he uses as an example of how ego can hinder a film's production and artistic integrity) and Absolute Power (which he uses as an example to illustrate why a movie does not have to be faithful to the book on which it is based). Two films he does not cover are Heat (for legal reasons) and The Chamber, because he did not consider it interesting.

The next part of the book has Goldman analyzing scenes from various screenplays he admires including There's Something About Mary, North by Northwest and Chinatown.

The next section covers how he gets movie ideas, and details four examples and why he didn't pursue them.

"The Old Guy", inspired by the true story about an elderly criminal (eventually made into a 2018 movie, The Old Man and The Gun, apparently without Goldman's participation). Goldman learned of the story in an April 1999 article in the San Francisco Chronicle.

"The Good Guy", an original story idea linking characters in the Littleton, Colorado school shooting and the death of JonBenet Ramsey, which took place in Boulder, Colorado.

"The Mastermind", expanding on the actual 1911 theft of the Mona Lisa painting, partially based on Seymour Reit's book The Day They Stole the Mona Lisa.

"The Dolphin," inspired by a New York Times article about an autistic 10-year-old boy surviving four days lost in an alligator- and snake-infested Florida swamp.

The final section is an original screenplay where he examines the writing process and asks other famous screenwriters for their opinions.

In between chapters are various musings on a range of topics from why not to open a script with a courtroom scene to how he sets about adapting a book. Some of these snippets offer an insight into Goldman's background that was not in the first book—such as his relationship with his parents, his university life and time in the military—the book thereby shading into autobiography.

The chapters on The Princess Bride, Misery, Maverick and The Ghost and the Darkness originally appeared in his books Four Screenplays and Five Screenplays and in the published shooting script for The Ghost and the Darkness.

== Reviews ==
Michael Sragow describes Which Lie Did I Tell? (More Adventures in the Screen Trade): "In addition to brief descriptions of topics like spitballing (brainstorming story notions) and expansions or reprints of behind-the-scenes stories already published as introductions to Goldman's screenplays, it contains famous scenes from other writers' screenplays; how-to advice on judging ideas, on turning ideas into stories and on writing them in a way that hooks the attention of a director or a star; and a partial draft of a script, with reactions from esteemed peers." School Library Journal wrote about Which Lie Did I Tell?, "From The Memoirs of an Invisible Man to Absolute Power, this master storyteller explains his role and his thought processes for each film, at the same time delivering an exposition on how stories are written and films are made. Sprinkled throughout is his advice for future screenwriters. In the second section, he analyzes classic film sequences, setting each scene, quoting excerpts from the screenplays, and then explaining what made them great. Finally, the author offers story ideas and examines their potential for the big screen."
