= Mohammed Ateeq Al-Falahi =

Emirati executive

Mohammed Ateeq Al Falahi is the secretary general of the Red Crescent Society of the United Arab Emirates. He is also the chairman of the Zayed House for Islamic Culture (ZHIC). He holds a Ph.D. He graduated from the New York Institute of Technology. He was listed in the 'Top 100 most powerful Arabs' in 2018 and 2019 by Gulf Business.
