= Itzhak Fisher =

Israeli businessman

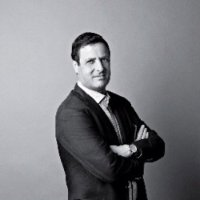

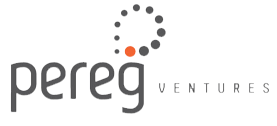

Itzhak Fisher (Hebrew: איציק פישר), is an Israeli businessman who served as the Founder and General Partner of Pereg Ventures.

He was previously Executive Vice President, Global Business Development at Nielsen Holdings. His responsibilities included strategic business development initiatives as well as all Mergers & Acquisitions and overseeing the Sports Practice. He was co-founder and chairman of Trendum, before selling the new entity to the Nielsen company.

In the 1990s, Fisher co-founded and was the CEO of RSL Communications, a Telco company which raised more than $1.7 billion dollars in capital. At the end of 2000, Fisher left the company, it was de-listed from NASDAQ, and was dissolved shortly thereafter.

He formerly also served as Benjamin Netanyahu's campaign official. He was Treasurer of the Likud party, in Israel, from 1992 to 1994. He graduated with a Bachelor of Science degree in computer science from the New York Institute of Technology.

== See also ==
- Taptica
