= NJ Ayuk =

Cameroonian attorney, entrepreneur and author

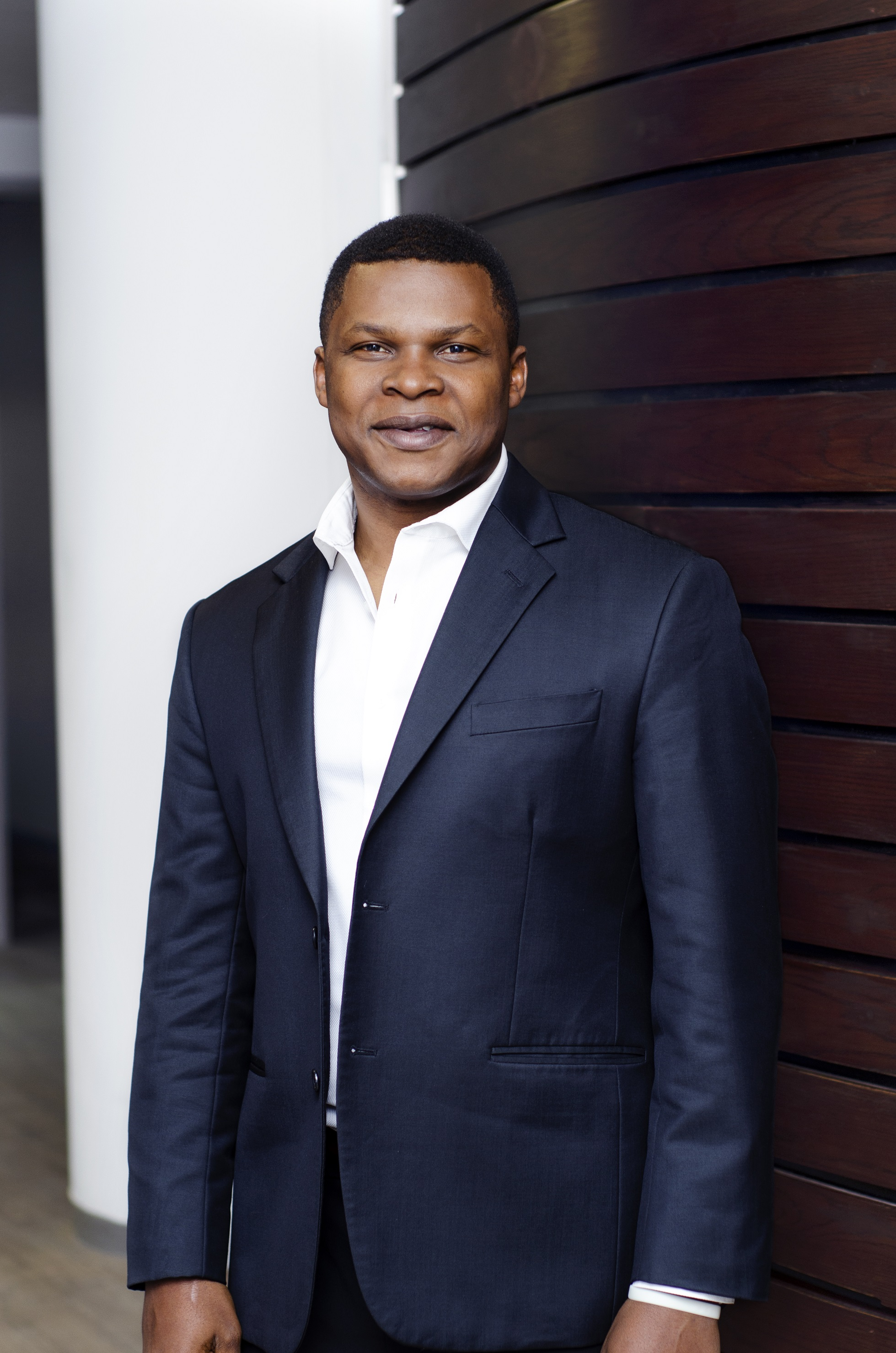
- NJ Ayuk in 2018
- Born: February 11, 1980 (age 46); Mamfe, Cameroon
- Education: University of Maryland, College Park (BS); William Mitchell College of Law(JD); New York Institute of Technology (MBA)
- Occupations: Attorney, Author, Entrepreneur
- Website: https://njayuk.com/

NJ Ayuk (born 11 February 1980) is a Cameroonian attorney, author, and businessman.

Ayuk is the founder and former chief executive officer (CEO) of the Centurion Law Group, a Pan-African law firm that operates in the energy, financial, and extractive sectors. He also is the executive chairman of the African Energy Chamber.

He is the author of several books and articles on energy. His book, A Just Transition: Making Energy Poverty History with an Energy Mix, was listed in the Wall Street Journal bestseller list.

== Early life and education ==
Ayuk was born in 1980 in Cameroon. In 2000, he moved to the United States and studied at the University of Maryland, College Park, graduating with a bachelor's degree in government and politics. In 2004, he earned a juris doctor degree at William Mitchell College of Law in the US. Additionally, he received a Master of Business Administration (MBA) from the New York Institute of Technology.

In 2007, a few months after beginning his legal career in the US, Ayuk founded the Centurion Law Group. Based in South Africa, the firm grew into one of the largest energy-focused law firms on the continent, with nearly 160 lawyers operating across Africa.

Also in 2007, he was convicted of fraud after pleading guilty to impersonating US congressman Donald M. Payne in order to obtain visas for at least nine Cameroon citizens; the crime occurred while he was interning for Payne. Ayuk was sentenced to 18 months probation and expulsion.

== Career ==
In 2007, a few months after working as a lawyer in the United States, Ayuk founded the Centurion Law Group. Now based in South Africa, the firm has become one of the largest energy-focused law firms on the continent, with nearly 160 lawyers across Africa. It is also the first African law firm to be listed on the German stock exchange.

In 2013, the government of Equatorial Guinea hired Ayuk to renegotiate the country’s one sided agreement with British multinational BG Group (later acquired by Shell), committing to purchase all of Equatorial Guinea’s liquefied natural gas (LNG) for 17 years. Ayuk was becoming a sought-after source of information on Africa’s oil and gas industry. Also in 2013, NJ Ayuk joined Global Shapers, a non-profit foundation created by the World Economic Forum to unite a community of young leaders.

In 2018, Ayuk was chosen to lead the African Energy Chamber. The organization aims to support the development of the African energy sector and promote best practices.

In 2019, Centurion Law Group launched Centurion International AG. The Germany-based energy advisory and legal services company was formed to facilitate African energy expansion and serve as a gateway for investors to participate in Africa’s development.

In 2022, Centurion International AG became the first Africa-focused services firm to have its shares listed on a German Stock Exchange.

In 2023, the Mail & Guardian reported that bogus copyright complaints were made to remove unflattering material about Ayuk and a politician.

In 2024, Ayuk stepped down as head of Centurion Law Group to focus on his work at the African Energy Chamber (AEC).

== Energy stance ==
After working for the United Nations Development Programme in Darfur, Sudan, Ayuk concluded that the war was rooted in a struggle for natural resources and the wealth associated with them. He soon after shifted his career to focus on Africa's energy resources.

A Just Transition: Making Energy Poverty History with an Energy Mix discusses the solution of moving Africa toward renewable sources of energy at the same time allowing the people to benefit from the continent’s fossil fuels. Ayuk argues how Africans should be able to continue benefiting from their natural resources, even as much of the world pushes the continent to leave its fossil fuels in support of global net-zero emissions objectives. He states that the entire continent produces only 3.8% of the world’s emissions, and, even if the continent tripled its natural gas-powered electricity consumption, the additional carbon dioxide would be the equivalent of only 1% of global emissions. He has said: “A continent that emits a negligible amount of carbon dioxide is being disproportionately pegged as a threat to the planet by developed nations."

== Recognition ==
In 2015, he was listed in Forbes' Top 10 Most Influential Men in Africa. Ayuk was named as one of the 100 Most Reputable Africans in 2023 by Reputation Poll International.

== Bibliography ==
Books

- Ayuk, NJ (2021) Billions at play: The Future of African Energy and Doing Deals, USA: Made for Success Publishing, ISBN 978-1913136345.
- Ayuk, NJ (2017) Big Barrels: African Oil and Gas and the Quest for Prosperity, USA: Clink Street Publishing, ISBN 978-1911525592.
- Ayuk, NJ (2023) A Just Transition: Making Energy Poverty History with an Energy Mix, Made for Success, ISBN 978-1641467506.

Articles

- Ayuk, NJ. (25 May 2021). "Net Zero? Not For Africa. Not Yet. Africa Must Fight Energy Poverty with Oil and Gas Development".
- Ayuk, NJ. "Energy Industry will be the bedrock of Africa’s Road to Recovery".
- Ayuk, NJ. (28 December 2020). "A Few Thoughts for this Generation of Africans in 2021: Be Bold and Cut Out Entitlement, No One Owes Us Anything".
- Ayuk, NJ (3 January 2020). "What will it take for 2020 to truly be the year of Gas in Nigeria?".
