= Robert E. Evanson =

American businessperson

Robert E. Evanson is an American businessperson who has been at the helm of some of the largest companies in the United States.

== Early life and education ==
Evanson was born September 12, 1936, in New York. He holds an MBA from New York Institute of Technology and a BBA from St. John's University.

== Career ==
From 2003 to 2008, he was a senior advisor to Apax Partners. He retired in 2003 as the President of McGraw-Hill Education. Before joining McGraw-Hill, he was chief financial officer and chief operating officer at Harcourt (publisher), from 1985 to 1992. He was also the chairman and CEO of SeaWorld Entertainment. In his early career, he held senior financial positions at Harper (publisher), Conrail, and Amtrak, and was a partner at Arthur Andersen.

He served as a faculty member at Pace University. He also served on the board of Harcourt, the Association of American Publishers (as chairman), and The Princeton Review. He also served on the board of universities such as Pace University, Western Governors University, NYIT, and Johns Hopkins University.
