= Chen Ningning =

Entrepreneur and philanthropist

Chen ("Diana") Ningning is an entrepreneur and philanthropist. She is the founder and CEO of Pioneer Group Holdings, Chair of Yintai Securities Co., Ltd, and CEO of Yintai Investment Company LLC. She has an estimated net worth of $1.2 billion (as of 2019). She graduated with an MBA degree from the New York Institute of Technology.

A philanthropist and educator, Diana serves on the Board of Trustees for Harvard-Westlake School, Yale University Sterling Fellows, Yale Jackson School of Global Affairs Advisory Council, Lincoln Center Board of Trustees, and the Harvard Alumni President's Associates.

As an alumnus, she serves on the Advisory Council of the Graduate School of Business at Stanford University. She is also a member of the Harvard Alumni Entrepreneurs Global Advisory Council.

Diana is Chair of the Centrum Charitas Foundation. She has been awarded the JP (Justice of the Peace) and BBS (Bronze Bauhinia Star) by the Government of Hong Kong Special Administrative Region, and she has participated in various Hong Kong government committees.
