= Abubakar Kabir Abubakar =

Nigerian politician (born 1981)

Abubakar Abubakar Kabir
- Born: 2 October 1981 (age 45); Bichi, Kano, Nigeria
- Education: New York Institute of Technology-BSc Interdisciplinary Studies: New York Institute of Technology-MSc Energy Management
- Occupations: Politician; philanthropist
- Known for: House of Reps

Abubakar Abubakar Kabir (born 2 October 1981) is a Nigerian politician. He is a current member of the Federal House of Representatives, and the former chairman of the Committee on Works.(2019-2023) And the chairman Committee Appropriation (2023-date) He was elected to the House of Representatives in 2019, under the platform of the All Progressives Congress party, representing the Bichi Federal Constituency.

== Education background ==
He attended Hagagawa Primary School, Bichi, Government Junior Secondary School Bichi, before proceeding to Dawakin Tofa Science College for his Senior Secondary School Certificate. He obtained a bachelor's degree in interdisciplinary studies from the New York Institute of Technology and a master's degree in energy management from same university.

== Political career ==
Being chairman of the Committee on Works, Abubakar Kabir has provided legislative support and checkmate to critical road projects across the country in engagement with contractors and the Ministry of Works and Housing.

He has led the committee to oversee projects such as the Lagos-Badagry Road, Abuja-Kano Road, Abuja-Kaduna-Zaria-Kano Road, Kano Light Rail Project, Eko Bridge Project.

In his jurisdiction, has delivered social and physical infrastructure, as well as donation of education support to his constituency.

The following bills have been sponsored by Abubakar Kabir in his tenure:

- a bill for the establishment of a University of Medicine and Health Sciences, Bichi, 2021
- a bill for the establishment of the Office of the Surveyor-General of the Federation (Establishment) Bill, 2021.
