= Suresh Kumar (businessman) =

- Born: c. 1957 (age 68–69)
- Citizenship: Indian-American
- Education: Indian Institute of Technology (B.Tech), Indian Institute of Management, Ahmedabad (MBA), New York Institute of Technology (M.S. Computer Science)
- Occupation: Technology executive
- Years active: 1986-present
- Employer: BNY Mellon
- Known for: Technology strategy and infrastructure at BNY Mellon
- Title: Senior Executive Vice President & Chief Information Officer

Suresh Kumar Indian-American business executive and technologist best known as the Senior Executive Vice President and Chief Information Officer for BNY.

== Early life and education ==
He earned a Bachelor of Technology degree from the Indian Institute of Technology at Madras, a Master of Business Administration degree from the Indian Institute of Management at Ahmedabad and a master's degree in Computer Science from the New York Institute of Technology.
