= Sigma Investments =

- Company type: Privately Held
- Industry: Holding company
- Founded: 2004
- Headquarters: Amman, Jordan
- Area served: MENA region
- Key people: Iman Mutlaq; Chief Executive Officer
- Services: Investment management
- Website: www.sigmaltd.org

Sigma Investments is a multinational company founded by Iman Mutlaq based in Amman, Jordan. It offers diversified investment opportunities and advisory services to clients.

== Affiliation ==
Sigma Investments is the sole agent of Australia-based INGOT Brokers in the Middle East; Ingot Brokers, a portal which enables trading on global currencies and precious metals, and also facilitates clients on reaching foreign exchange markets. It is a member of Global Alliance Partners (GAP).

== Egyptian Commodities Exchange ==
Sigma investments and Ingot are members of the three member consortium which signed cooperation protocol with Egyptian government to establish a US$35–50m worth electronic Egyptian Commodities Exchange in Egypt as the first ever country in the MENA region; it will facilitate the well-being of the small farmers and supply of products at reasonable prices abolishing the monopoly of goods.
