= Zhang Enhe =

Chinese engineer

- 张恩和
- Born: 1939; China
- Died: 2016 (aged 76–77); Beijing, China
- Education: Harbin Institute of Technology; New York Institute of Technology
- Awards: Science and Technology Award of the Ho Leung Ho Lee Foundation
- Scientific career
- Fields: Jet Engines
- Workplaces: Taihang Engine (太行发动机)

Zhang Enhe (simplified Chinese: 张恩和; traditional Chinese: 張恩和; pinyin: Zhāng Ēnhé; 1939- 13 November 2016) was a Chinese scientist who engaged himself in the course of Chinese aero engine development for more than 40 years.

== Biography ==
Zhang was born in 1939, during the Second Sino-Japanese War. After graduating from Harbin Institute of Technology in 1965, he was assigned to Shenyang Engine Design Institute. In 1981, after the Cultural Revolution, Zhang was sent abroad to study at the New York Institute of Technology on government scholarships. Zhang returned to China in November 1983 and that year became team leader of Engine Room of the Shenyang Engine Design Institute. In 1985 he was promoted to deputy director. He served as chief engine engineer of the Xian Y-7, he led the team to achieve the goal of reducing oil by 9.4% of the engine, for which he won a gold medal conferred by the Chinese government. In 1987 Zhang was appointed deputy commander of the Taihang Engine, and four years later became its chief designer. In October 2007 he was awarded the Science and Technology Award of the Ho Leung Ho Lee Foundation. Zhang died of illness on November 13, 2016.

== Awards ==
- Title of "Shenyang Model Worker"
- Liaoning Provincial May First Labour Medal
- National May First Labour Medal
- Special Award of the National Defense Science and Technology Progress Award
- Science and Technology Award of the Ho Leung Ho Lee Foundation
