= Ameera Al-Kooheji =

Ameera Ali Al-Kooheji (Arabic: أميرة الكوهجي ) is a Bahraini TV presenter, Director and Producer as well as a Social media figure from the Kingdom of Bahrain best known for her bilingual abilities as an Arabic and English speaker and for her writing and creative abilities in both languages. Al-Kooheji was the host of the Morning Show Hala Bahrain in 2015 and is now the director and presenter of the famous TV show Kashta Riyadhiya (Arabic: كشته رياضية ) aired on Bahrain TV and Bahrain Sports Channel 1. The show hosts famous sports celebrities in a classical car ride around the Island and Al-Kooheji is the main host as well as director and editor of the show. Al-Kooheji is also the producer of Success Stories, a program also run on Bahrain Television Channel 44 and is the producer of numerous shows and reports aired on other channels such as Jeem TV and Al Aan TV, which are all done through her association with ABS Network as a producer. Al-Kooheji has also recognizable work in the music field as a producer of many commercial jingles, school and corporate songs and as the vocalist of a number of international songs. Ameera is also known as a Voice Over Artist and as a radio host.

Graduated with a B.S. degree in International Business from New York Institute of Technology - New York City in 2007, Ameera attended the Lebanese American University in Beirut - Lebanon from 2002 to 2005 majoring in Communication Arts with a speciality in radio, TV, and film. After working in the marketing field for 3 years, Ameera entered the music scene as a vocalist and producer. Moving to New York to experiment with her music, she returned in 2009 to work as a radio host and TV reporter. The same year, Ameera started producing video and short film projects for clients and companies and producing radio ads. She soon started her own production house that she runs until today under the name Kooheji Productions. Ameera started presenting in 2015 and rose to fame immediately as a household name and "Bahrain's sweetheart." Ameera currently works with several networks as a TV presenter and producer/director, and continues to run her own business as an independent production house.
