= Iman Mutlaq =

Jordanian entrepreneur

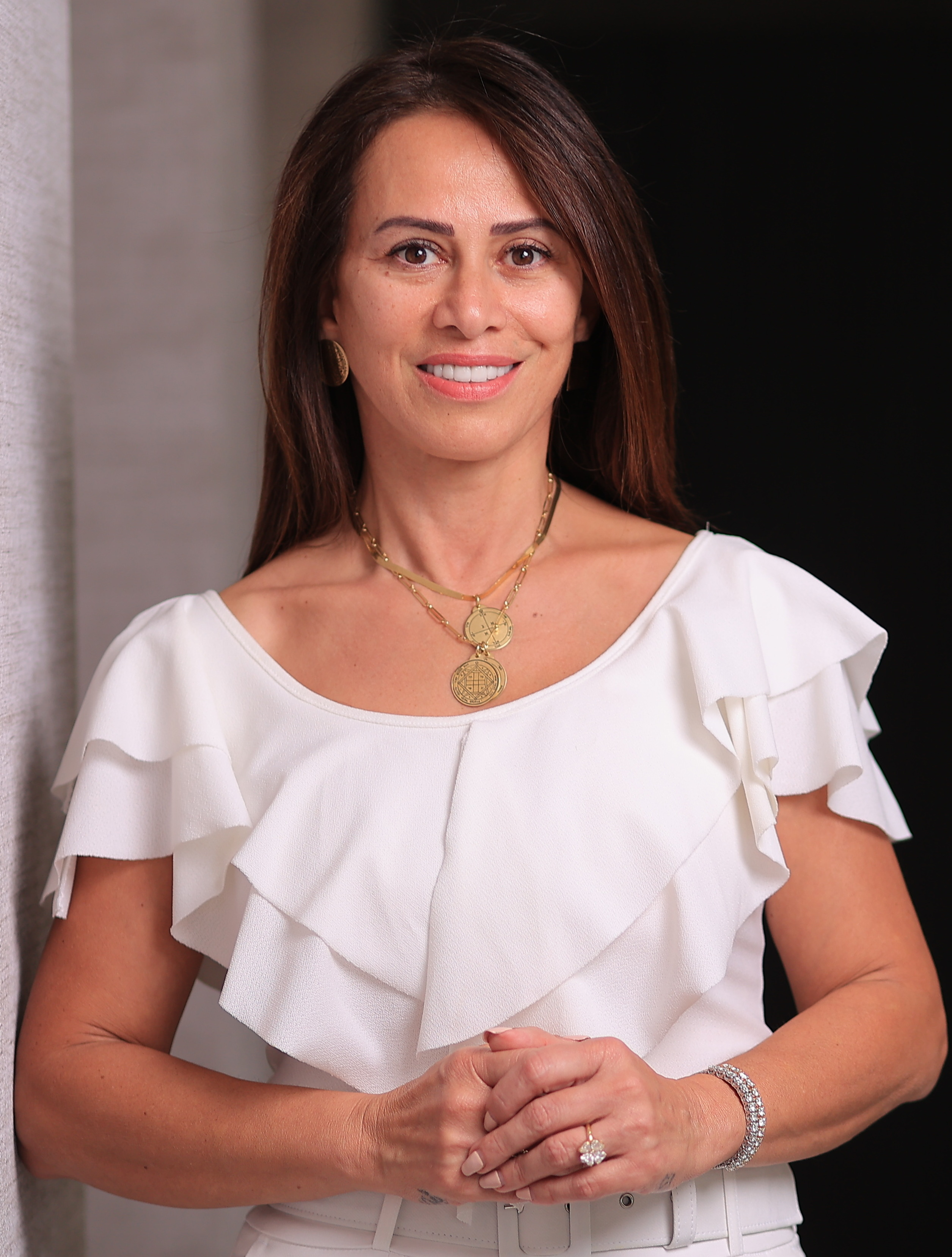
- Iman Mutlaq in 2023
- Born: Saudi Arabia
- Education: MBA in Finance (New York Institute of Technology)
- Occupations: Entrepreneurship; Financier; Humanitarian worker
- Title: Sigma Investments; Founder and CEO (Amman, Jordan) Director of Global Alliance Partners (Hong Kong) President of International Association for Human Values, Jordan Founder of 8x8 Women, Jordan
- Website: www.imanmutlaq.com

Iman Mutlaq (Arabic: إيمان مطلق) is a Jordanian entrepreneur, financier and social activist. She is the founder and chief executive of Sigma Investments, a Jordan-based multinational financial company established in 2006, and founder of the INGOT Group, a consortium of multinational financial companies operating across multiple continents.

She received a number of awards for her businesses, activism, and achievements in the finance industry, in addition to receiving multiple recognitions for her humanitarian efforts, such as being appointed as a UN goodwill Ambassador.

Forbes named her one of the most powerful businesswomen in the Middle East, one of the top women leading top companies in the Middle East, and one of the 100 most powerful Arab businesswomen.

== Early life and education ==
Mutlaq was born in 1966 in Al Khobar, Saudi Arabia. Until age 13, Mutlaq lived in Al Khobar, Saudi Arabia, with her mother and sister following her father's passing when she was six years old.

Mutlaq received her bachelor's degree in business administration from Al-Ahliyya Amman University in Jordan. And In 2007, she received an MBA in Finance from the New York Institute of Technology.

Since her early days as a teenager, Mutlaq wanted to be a businesswoman, so she started her first business when she was only 14 years old.

== Personal life ==
Mutlaq raised her two sons as a single mother after her divorce at the age of twenty four.

== Career ==
Mutlaq established her export-import business at the age of eighteen and then entered the financial industry at the age of 27 covering the regions of Middle East and North Africa. She is currently managing Jordan based Sigma Investments.

She directs Ingot Consultation Bahrain, a financial services provider since 2015 focusing in the MENA region; and enables trading on global currencies and precious metals, and also helps clients reach foreign exchange markets.

She is involved in angel investing in projects which enhance women's creativity and ideas. She is also targeting applications for mobile devices through her startup, Dreamtech since 2015.

== Activism and women's empowerment ==
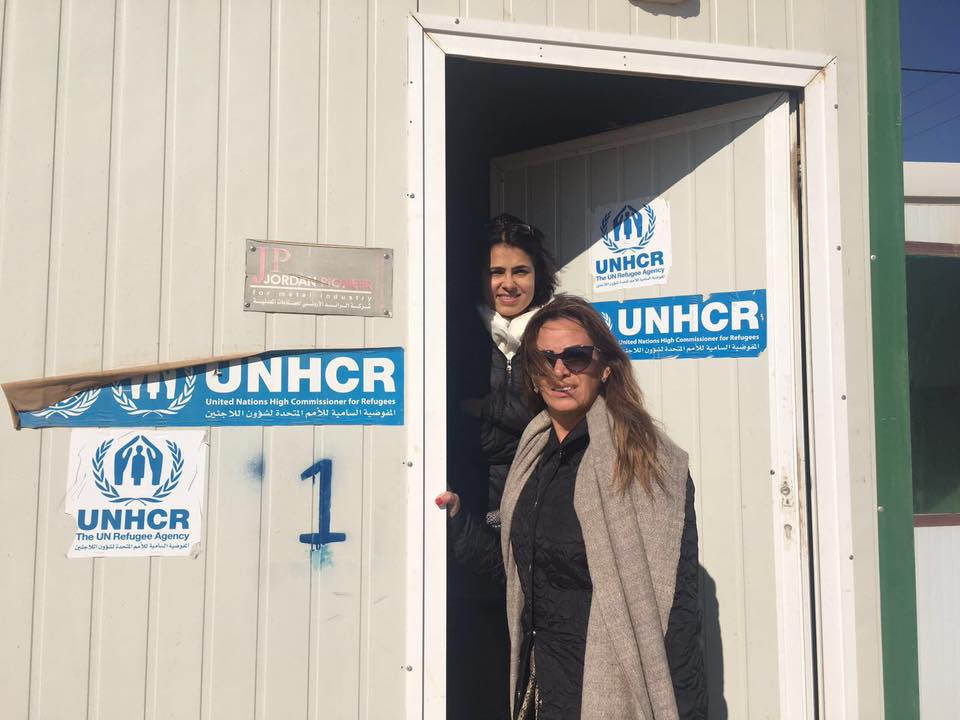
Iman visits the Zaatari refugee camp for implementing psychosocial support by the International Association for Human Values, Jordan; co-funded by the European Union for the Syrian refugees.

Participant in an expedition to Mount Kilimanjaro in 2014 in an effort to support the cancer research initiatives of the King Hussein Cancer Center; the expedition raised $1.3 million.

First instructor of the Art of Living Foundation, an initiative of Sri Sri Ravi Shankar in Jordan.

President of the Geneva International Association for Human Values in Jordan.

Initiator of six programs in Iraq among 400 women for advancing their careers.

Participant at the inaugural US Presidential Summit on Entrepreneurship invited by The Obama Administration in 2010; she met Hillary Clinton and Richard Holbrooke there and discussed issues affecting women in Afghanistan and across the Middle East.

== Sigma Investments ==
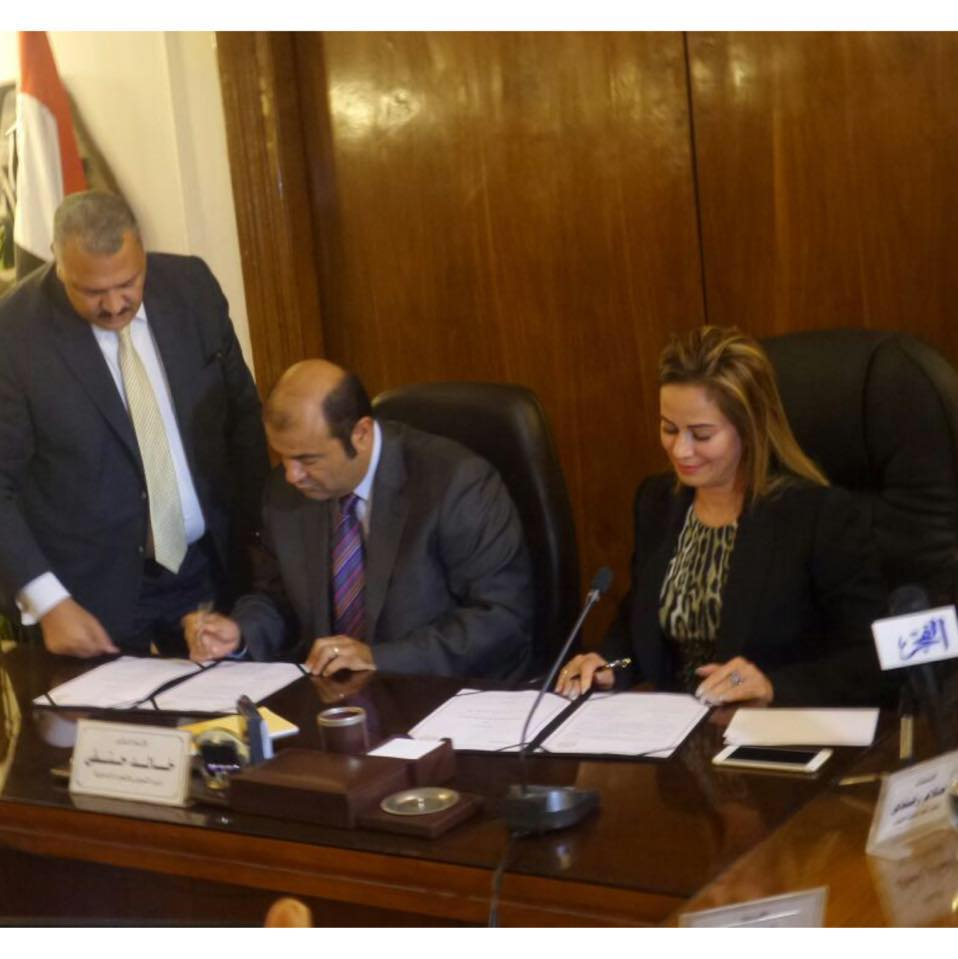
Iman signs cooperation protocol with Khaled Hanafi, Egypt's Supply Minister on behalf of the consortium to establish first ever electronic Egyptian Commodities Exchange in Egypt in November 2015.

Sigma Investments and Ingot are members of the three member consortium which signed cooperation protocol with Egyptian government to establish a US$35–50m worth electronic Egyptian Commodities Exchange in Egypt as the first ever country in the MENA region; it will facilitate the well being of the small farmers and supply of products at reasonable prices abolishing the monopoly of goods.

== Achievements and awards ==
- ’Outstanding Woman Financial Innovation Leader in Middle East’ at the ‘Asian Digital Finance Forum and Awards’ in 2022.
- Forbes magazine's Middle East edition, published in 2020 ranked Iman Mutlaq to 30th position in a list of "Power Businesswomen in The Middle East 2020”.
- Forbes magazine's Middle East edition, published in 2019 ranked Iman Mutlaq to 18th position in a list of "Women Leading Top Companies in the Middle East”.
- Forbes magazine's Middle East edition, published in 2016, 2017 and 2018 ranked Iman Mutlaq to 32nd, 41st and 38th positions respectively in a list of "The 100 Most Powerful Arab Businesswomen."
- Keynote Speaker at the first "Asia-Pacific Executives Forum" which was held at Hilton Hotel in Sri Lanka in 2017.
- Best Woman in the Corporate Sector at the AmCham MENA Council Women in Business Awards in 2016.
- Global Alliance Partners, a network of financial entities has elected Iman as the first female director at its Conference in New York City in 2016.
- Jordan's Top Businesswomen in 2015.
- Iman has been appointed "Goodwill Ambassador for Human Rights and Peace" in Jordan in 2014.
