= Red Crescent Society of the United Arab Emirates =

Medical society in the United Arab Emirates

Coordinates: 24°28′12″N 54°22′46″E

- الهلال الأحمر الإماراتي
- Formation: 1983
- Type: Non profit
- Purpose: to help the needy and people who are facing danger
- Headquarters: Abu Dhabi
- Location: UAE
- General Secretary: Mohammed Ateeq Al-Falahi
- President: Hamdan bin Zayed
- Affiliations: ICRC; IFRC
- Website: www.emiratesrc.ae

The Red Crescent Society of the United Arab Emirates (Arabic: الهلال الأحمر الإماراتي, romanized: al-Hilāl al-Aḥmar al-Imārātī) is the United Arab Emirates (UAE) affiliate of the International Federation of Red Cross and Red Crescent Societies. The authority was founded in Abu Dhabi in 1983 with support of the late Sheikh Zayed bin Sultan Al Nahyan. Its main objectives are to carry out Red Cross operations on a systematic basis throughout the UAE.

The Emirates Red Crescent has helped over 228 million people over the world and has worked in 124 countries to ensure the wellbeing of people. They have spent 3 billion dollars (10 billion dirhams) on helping people worldwide.
