= Bill Zerella =

American businessperson

Bill Zerella is an American businessperson, best known for being the chief financial officer (CFO) of Fitbit. Zerella left FitBit in 2018, and as of fall 2023, he was the CFO of ACV Auctions.

Zerella earned a Bachelor of Science from the New York Institute of Technology (1978) and a Master of Business Administration from New York University.
