= Nicholas Estavillo =

Retired Puerto Rican NYPD police officer

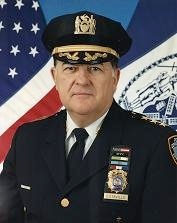
- Born: March 13, 1945 (age 81); Hato Rey, Puerto Rico
- Education: New York Institute of Technology (BCJ); FBI National Academy
- Police career
- Department: New York City Police Department
- Service years: 1968–2007
- Rank: Chief of Patrol
- Awards: NYPD Excellent Police Duty
- Military career
- Allegiance: United States of America
- Branch: United States Marine Corps
- Service years: 1964–1967
- Rank: Sergeant
- Unit: 3rd Reconnaissance Battalion
- Conflicts: Vietnam War

Notes
- Estavillo served as a member of the Marines Recon Force during the Vietnam War.

NYPD Chief of Patrol Nicholas Estavillo (Ret.), (born March 13, 1945) is a former member of the New York Police Department who in 2002 became the first Puerto Rican and the first Hispanic in the history of the NYPD to reach the three-star rank of Chief of Patrol.

== Early years ==
Estavillo was born and raised in the sector Hato Rey, a section of San Juan the capital of Puerto Rico. There he received his primary education at El Colegio del Espiritu Santo. In 1954, when he was nine years old, he moved to New York City with his mother. They lived in the borough of Brooklyn, where he attended St. Peter's School. Estavillo graduated from Bishop Loughlin Memorial High School and was awarded the Puerto Rican Leadership Scholarship, making it possible for him to attend St. Francis College.

Estavillo enlisted in the United States Marine Corps during the Vietnam War and went to boot camp at Marine Corps Recruit Depot Parris Island in South Carolina. Was a member of the 3rd Force, Recon Co. of the Marines Recon Force. After three years of service (1964–1967) which included a tour of duty in Vietnam, Estavillo was honorably discharged with the rank of sergeant. He continued his education at the New York Institute of Technology where he earned a Bachelor of Science degree in Criminal Justice.

== Career in the NYPD ==
In 1968, Estavillo applied to become an officer in the New York Police Department and graduated from the New York Police Academy after six months of training. His first assignment as a Police Officer was at the 19th Precinct located at East 67th Street on the Upper East Side of Manhattan. The population density of the 19th Precinct is one of the highest in the United States, with residents estimated at 217,063.

In 1988, Estavillo graduated from the FBI National Academy at Quantico, Virginia. Back with the NYPD, he rose in rank throughout the years and served as Precinct Patrol Sergeant and Precinct Lieutenant/Platoon Commander at the 24th Precinct. As Captain, he served as Commanding Officer of the 34th Precinct covering the Manhattan neighborhoods of Washington Heights and Inwood. By 1993 he was promoted to Inspector and Deputy Chief, Commanding Officer Fifth Division, covering the Upper West Side of Manhattan. In 1995 he was promoted to two star Assistant Chief and designated Commanding Officer, Patrol Borough Manhattan North which includes the neighborhoods and 12 precincts north of 59th Street in Manhattan. There he served until promotion to Chief of Patrol in 2002. The majority of the population in that district are of Hispanic origin.

== NYPD Chief of Patrol ==
In 2002, Estavillo was promoted to Chief of Patrol, thus becoming the first Hispanic to reach the executive level of three stars Chief at N.Y.P.D. More than 20,000 Police Officers and 4,000 Civilian support staff of the N.Y.P.D. Patrol Services Bureau were under his supervision.

The duties of a Chief of Patrol include the coordination and deployment of the Department's eight Patrol Boroughs which include 76 Precinct Commands. The Patrol Chief is also in charge of the Special Operations Division, which includes the Emergency Services Unit, Mounted Unit, Aviation Unit, Harbor Unit and Canine Unit. Estavillo managed the resources to combat crime and support counter terrorism strategies; provided supervision to direct, observe and evaluate performance, equipment and training of personnel. Estavillo retired in 2007 from the NYPD.

== Dates of rank ==
Sworn in as a Patrolman - 1968
Promoted to Sergeant - 1978
Promoted to Lieutenant - 1983
Promoted to Captain - 1989
Promoted to Deputy Inspector - 1990
Promoted to Inspector - 1992
Promoted to Deputy Chief - 1994
Promoted to Assistant Chief - 1995
Promoted to Chief of Patrol - 2002

== Legacy ==
In 2003, Estavillo was named National Grand Marshal of the Puerto Rican Day Parade in New York City. In 2006, he was the recipient of the Leadership Award, given during the Law Enforcement Explorer Awards ceremonies.

Estavillo is the father of four children and has six grandchildren. He is a member of the New York State Association of Chiefs of Police, the American Academy of Professional Law Enforcement, the N.Y.P.D. Marine Corps Association, the Marine Force Recon Association, the F.B.I. National Academy Associates, the N.Y.P.D. Hispanic Society and serves as advisor to the Association of Retired Hispanic Police.

== Military decorations ==
Among Estavillo's military decorations and awards are the following:

Combat Action Ribbon	Navy Presidential Unit Citation	National Defense Service Medal
Vietnam Service Medal with one bronze service star	Vietnam Gallantry Cross unit citation	Vietnam Campaign Medal

Badges

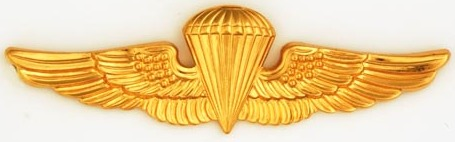
- Navy and Marine Corps Parachutist Badge
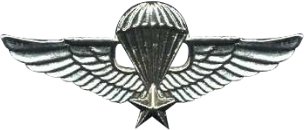
- Vietnamese Parachutist Badge

== See also ==
- List of Puerto Ricans

Police appointments
Preceded by William Morange	NYPD Chief of Patrol; 2002–2007	Succeeded by Robert Giannelli
