= Antonio Meneses Saillant =

American actor and director (born 1975)

Antonio Meneses Saillant (born Alfonso Antonio Meneses; August 17, 1975) is an American actor, director, screenwriter, producer and green activist.

Born and raised in New York City, Saillant has a degree in Aerospace and Mechanical Engineering from the New York Institute of Technology. Prior to starting his production company, Angel Light Pictures Entertainment Group, Saillant served as an energy consultant to Con Edison and pharmaceutical companies. Saillant's services include consulting with corporations in Green productions.Prior to starting his production company, Angel Light Pictures Entertainment Group, Saillant served as an energy consultant to Con Edison and pharmaceutical companies. Saillant's services include consulting with corporations in Green productions.

As an actor, Saillant appeared as the unnamed Italian Henchman in the 2006 film, Killa Season. He also produced the fantasy thriller, The Ascension, starring Corbin Bernsen and a romantic dark comedy entitled Heterosexuals, starring J. Robert Spencer.Prior to starting his production company, Angel Light Pictures Entertainment Group, Saillant served as an energy consultant to Con Edison and pharmaceutical companies. Saillant's services include consulting with corporations in Green productions. Ted Kotcheff, hired Saillant to direct his documentary, The Apprenticeship of Ted Kotcheff, which explores Kotcheff's life and times as a Canadian/Hollywood Director. Richard Dreyfuss is set to narrate the documentary. Kotcheff is best known for Law & Order: Special Victims Unit, where Saillant shadowed him for several seasons.

On April 18, 2012, Saillant delivered a presentation at Syracuse University entitled “green economy,” about sustainable entertainment strategies.
