= Jill Wruble =

American radiologist

Jill Wruble is an American diagnostic radiologist who serves as Chief of Ultrasound Services and Associate Director of the Radiology Residency Program at UConn John Dempsey Hospital. She has spoken and written on topics including overdiagnosis due to incidental imaging finding and cancer screening.. She has also written on the topic of radiology reporting and the negative effects of overtreatment. She is the founder of GlobalRadZambia, an organization that trains radiologists in Zambia, created to address the critical shortage of radiologists in Zambia..

== TEDx University of Pennsylvania (2015): “Incidentalomas: What they are and why we should be concerned” ==
In this TEDx talk, Wruble discussed incidental findings in medical imaging and the clinical challenges associated with their management. The presentation examined efforts within radiology to develop standardized approaches for evaluating and reporting such findings.

== TEDx West Point (2019): “The Myth of Early Detection of Cancer” ==
Delivered at TEDx West Point, in this TEDx talk, Wruble discussed concepts related to cancer screening, including false positives, lead-time bias, and length-time bias. The presentation addressed the benefits and limitations of screening programs and the role of evidence-based decision-making in cancer care.

== Global RAD Zambia ==
Wruble is the founder and director of GlobalRadZambia, a radiology residency program in Zambia that is designed to expand the radiology workforce in this underserved setting. GlobalRadZambia was launched in 2021 to address the lack of formal postgraduate radiology education in Zambia.

The program features mentorship, interactive case-based teaching, and faculty engagement from international radiologists. By 2026, the program had graduated four classes totaling sixteen radiologists (increasing the number of practicing radiologists in Zambia from seven in 2019, for a population of nineteen million, to twenty-three in 2026). The initiative has expanded to include trainees from Malawi, the Democratic Republic of Congo, and Namibia, and is being applied in the development of Sierra Leone’s first radiology training program.

Prior to establishing GlobalRadZambia, Wruble served as Associate Program Director for an international radiology residency at Kilimanjaro Christian Medical Center in Moshi, Tanzania.

== Biography ==
Wruble earned her Doctor of Osteopathic Medicine from the New York College of Osteopathic Medicine and her Bachelor of Arts from Williams College. Her academic appointments have included positions at the University of Connecticut, Yale University, the University of Minnesota, and Georgetown University.

== Military Service ==
Wruble served in the United States Army Medical Corps from 1988 to 2005). Her assignments included service as General Medical Officer at the 43rd MASH in South Korea. She completed Diagnostic Radiology Residency at Walter Reed Army Medical Center and later served as staff radiologist at the West Haven VA Medical Center.

== Awards and Honorary Doctorate ==
Wruble was named Teacher of the Year by the American Osteopathic College of Radiology in 2023. In 2025, she received an Honorary Doctor of Science degree from the New York Institute of Technology and delivered the commencement keynote address.

== Radiology Leadership Roles ==
Wruble has served on the National Cancer Institute Cancer Screening and Prevention Board and previously chaired the Radiology Council at the Lown Institute. She has also served as an examiner for the American Osteopathic Board of Radiology and as a peer reviewer for medical journals.
