= Ben Wolo =

Ben Wolo served as the Managing Director, and a board member of Liberia Telecommunications Corporation. He also served as Director of Engineering and Operations at Qwest. He holds degrees in Engineering and Computer Science from New York Institute of Technology.
