= Rade Džambić =

Serbian basketball player

Personal information
- Born: July 14, 1980 (age 46) SR Serbia, SFR Yugoslavia
- Listed height: 1.88 m (6 ft 2 in)

Career information
- College: Texas–Pan American (2002–2004); NYIT Bears (2004–2005)
- NBA draft: 2002: undrafted
- Playing career: 2005–2015
- Position: Guard

Career history
- 2005–2006: Radnik Bijeljina
- 2006–2007: Ergonom
- 2008: BKK Radnički
- 2008–2009: BC Timișoara
- 2009–2010: Iraklis Thessaloniki
- 2010: BC Timișoara
- 2010–2011: Municipal București
- 2011: BC Timișoara
- 2011–2012: CSU Asesoft Ploiești
- 2012–2014: CSU Craiova
- 2014: Rabotnički
- 2014: ETHA Engomis
- 2014–2015: ZTE KK

Rade Džambić (Serbian Cyrillic: Раде Џамбић; born July 14, 1982) is a Serbian former professional basketball player who last played for ZTE KK.
