= James Chip Cleary =

James Chip Cleary is the American president and principal head of the International Association of Amusement Parks and Attractions. He is a graduate of NYIT.
