= Art Klein (producer) =

American film producer

Art Klein is a producer known for Bottle Shock, Nobel Son and Marilyn Hotchkiss' Ballroom Dancing & Charm School, among others. He is a graduate of New York Institute of Technology.
