= African Energy Chamber =

Energy law group based in South Africa

- Founded: 2018
- Website: energychamber.org

African Energy Chamber (AEC) is an energy advocacy group based in South Africa, founded in 2018 by Nj Ayuk. It is focused on legal issues related to oil and gas in African countries.

== Activities ==
In 2021, the AEC organized African Energy Week (AEW), which aims at diminishing energy poverty in Africa.

In 2022, the AEC organized its second AEW in Cape Town, South Africa, where it launched a summit on hydrogen.

== Works ==
In March 2021, the AEC published its book, African Energy Road to Recovery: How the African Energy Industry Can Reshape Itself for a Post COVID-19 Comeback. The book outlined issues and potential solutions to oil and gas in African countries and described Africa's economic conditions during the COVID-19 pandemic.
