= P. C. Richard & Son =

Chain of American household goods stores

P.C. Richard & Son, Inc.

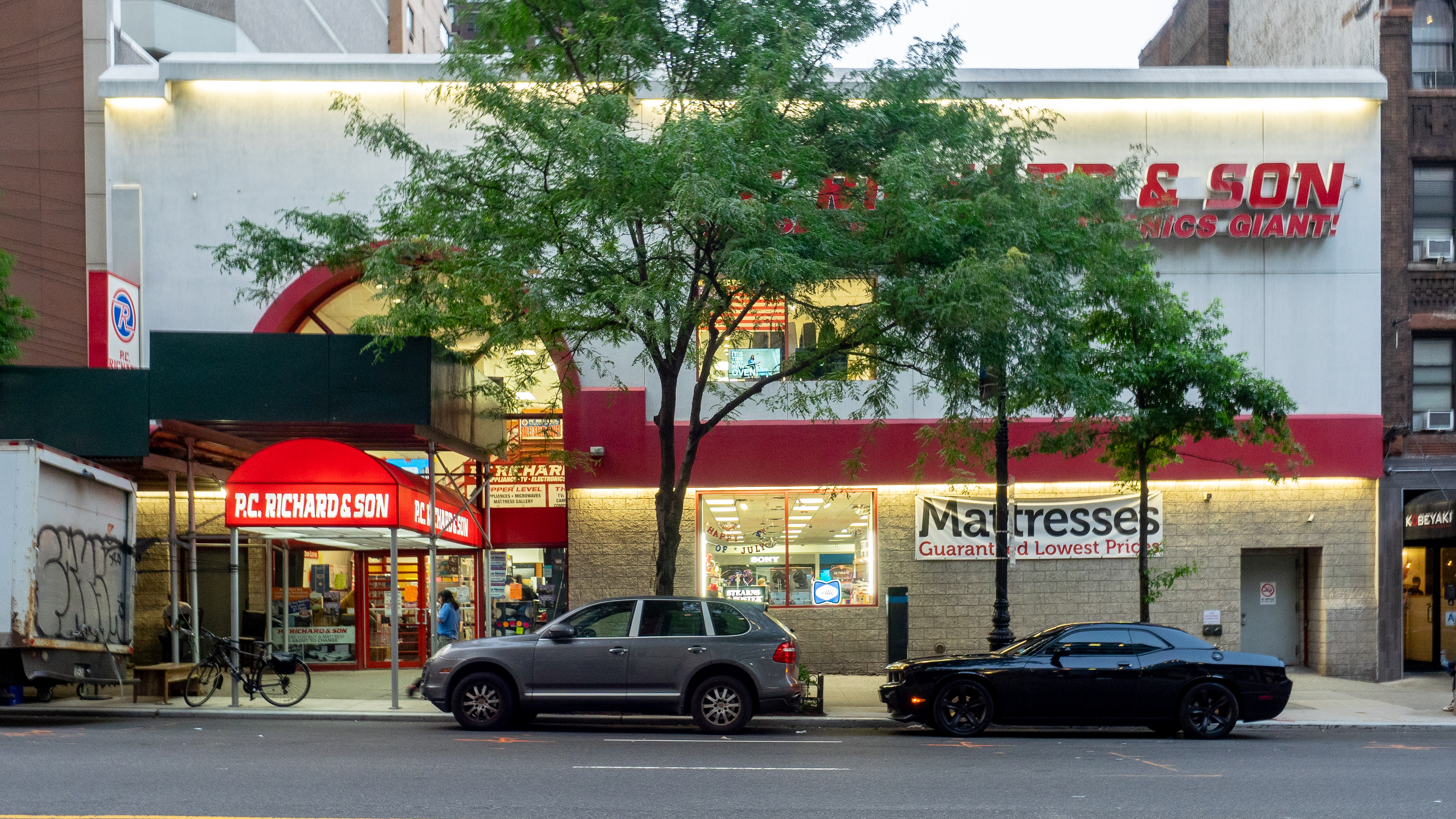
- Location in Upper East Side, New York City
- Type: Private
- Industry: Retail
- Founded: September 26, 1909; 117 years ago
- Founders: Alfred J. Richard; Pieter Christian Richard
- Headquarters: Farmingdale, New York, U.S.
- Area served: Northeastern United States
- Key people: Gregg Richard (President and CEO)
- Revenue: ▲US$1.5 billion (2008)
- Number of employees: ~3,000 (2018)

P.C. Richard & Son, commonly known as simply P.C. Richard, is the largest chain of private, family-owned appliance, television, electronics, and mattress stores in the United States. Its 66 stores are located in New York, New Jersey, Connecticut and Pennsylvania, with the majority of the stores located on Long Island, including the New York City boroughs of Queens and Brooklyn.

== History ==
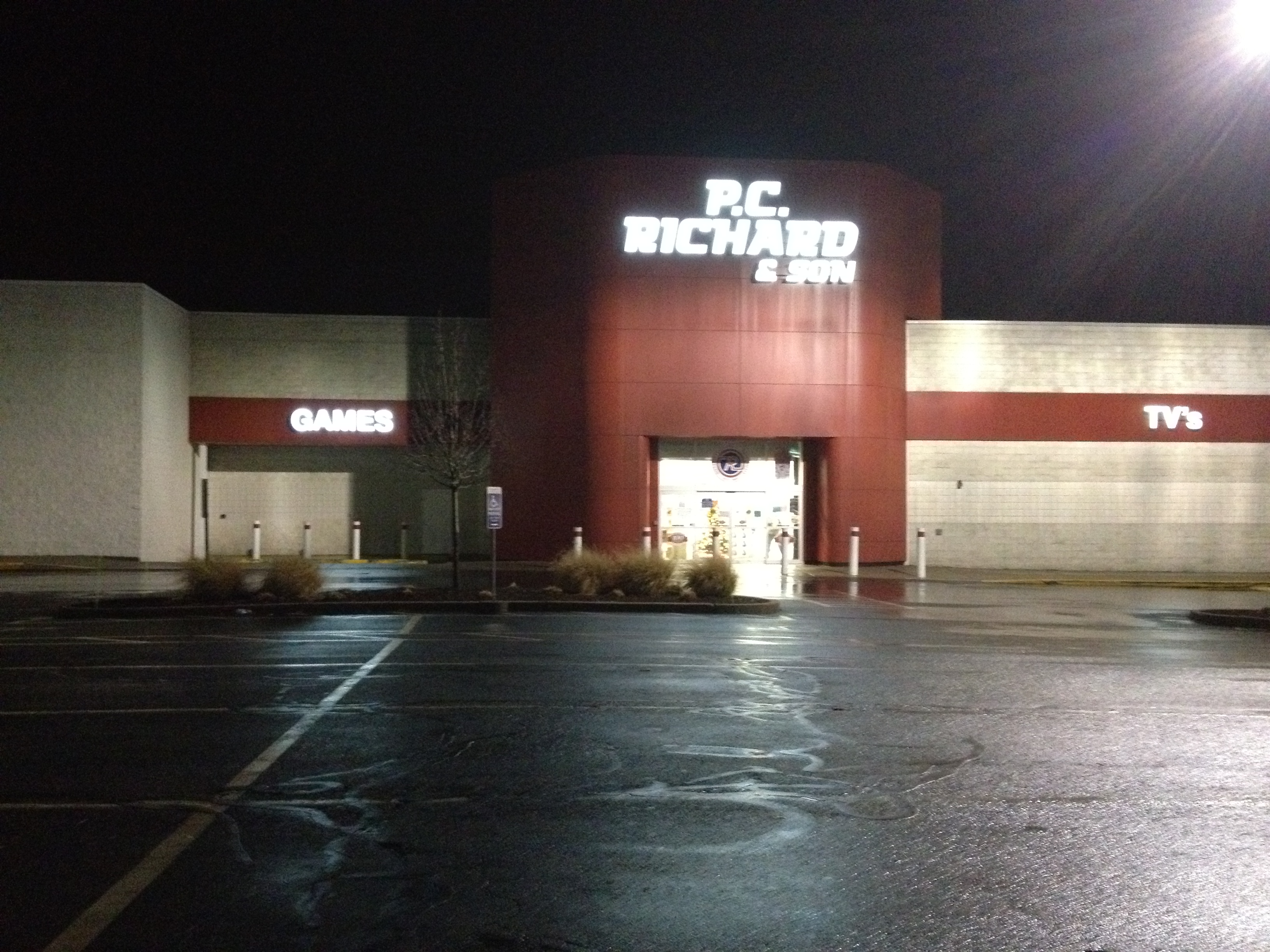
A P.C. Richard & Son store in Manchester, Connecticut, after replacing a former Circuit City store.

In 1909, Pieter Christian Richard, who left Holland in 1899, opened a small hardware store in Bensonhurst, Brooklyn (“Work Well Done” 14). In October of that same year, P.C.’s son, Alfred J. Richard (A.J.), was born. Born into the business less than a month after it opened, A.J. played an important role from the beginning. He spent his childhood helping out at the store, only leaving it to go to school. When he completed ninth grade in 1923, A.J. decided to drop out of school and focus entirely on helping his family and building the business (“Work Well Done” 25). A.J. was responsible for introducing the first electric appliance to the inventory, the electric clothes iron, as well as time payments so his customers could afford them (“Work Well Done” 32).

On February 1, 1947, A.J. officially took over as the company president and majority shareholder. It was around this time that he began to introduce his sons, Peter and Gary, to the family business (“Work Well Done” 58). Soon, the company grew into a chain as it expanded into Long Island. After the death of his father P.C. in 1972, A.J. promoted himself to chairman of the board in 1974, and he held that position until his death, well into his nineties. Peter and Gary were originally named co-presidents, but this arrangement changed in 1982, when Gary became president and Peter became executive vice president. Soon, Gary’s son Gregg began to work his way into the fabric of the company in the same way his father and grandfather had, until he became president in 2004. A.J. died weeks later at ninety-five years old. "The fourth generation, Gregg Richard, Bonni Rondinello and Peter Richard, III" are now involved in helping to run what their great-grandfather began.

== Growth and expansion ==
P.C. Richard and Son expanded into New Jersey in 1993 (“Work Well Done” 111). Between 1995 and 2003, it opened fifteen new showrooms in New Jersey, Westchester County, Manhattan, Brooklyn, Queens, and Long Island (“Work Well Done” 127).

In 2009, P.C. Richard and Son opened 6 new stores in former Circuit City locations, including its first in Connecticut. It continued to expand in Connecticut in 2010, opening stores in Milford, North Haven, Danbury, Newington, Manchester, and Enfield. The first Pennsylvania superstore opened in Philadelphia in June of that year.

The company added mattresses to its inventory in 2014, featuring Sealy, Stearns & Foster, and Tempur-Pedic brands in fourteen stores.

In 2016, P.C. Richard and Son began an exclusive retail partnership with Beko, one of Europe's leading appliance brands. This is Beko's first appearance in the United States market.

=== Builders Division ===
Separate from its retail operations, the company has a unit it calls its Builders Division, to arrange bulk purchases by builders, property managers and large facilities.

=== Official sponsorships ===
- Official Appliance, Electronics and Mattress retailer of the New York Yankees
- Barclays Center (NY)
- The Long Island Ducks (NY)
- iHeartRadio Theater (NY) (ground floor 250-seat theater at 32 Avenue of the Americas formerly known as P.C. Richard & Son Theater)
- New York Islanders (NY)
- Brooklyn Nets (NY)
- Music Conservatory of Westchester
- Nassau Coliseum (NY)
- The Somerset Patriots (NJ)
- Raceway Park (NJ)
- Splish Splash Water Park (NY)
- Sun National Bank Center (NJ)
- UConn Athletics (CT)
- Webster Bank Arena (CT)

== Thanksgiving ==
The New York Times wrote that "the chain's commercials emphasize people over products" and added that "some of their ads strike an earnest tone that evokes Norman Rockwell's America" and quoted a customer view about "what makes P.C. Richard tick." Part of this approach, according to what The New York Daily News printed, is being "a store that values employees enough to let them spend Thanksgiving with their families." New York Newsday wrote about being "closed on Thanksgiving and opening at 4 a.m. on Black Friday."

Social networking supports being closed on Thanksgiving, said a 2014 New York Post opinion item.

== Jingle ==
P.C. Richard & Son is known for its trademark 5-note whistle jingle created by Soundsmith worker Leer Leary. At home games of three baseball teams: the New York Yankees, their Double-A affiliate, the Somerset Patriots, and an independent team, the Long Island Ducks, the jingle plays after a pitcher strikes out an opposing batter.
