= The Works (film) =

- Directed by: Lance Williams
- Written by: Lance Williams
- Produced by: Dr. Alexander Schure
- Cinematography: Dick Lundin
- Edited by: Ed Catmull; Jim & Christine St. Lawrence
- Music by: Christie Barton
- Production company: Computer Graphics Lab
- Running time: 90 minutes
- Country: United States
- Language: English

The Works is a shelved animated feature film written and directed by Lance Williams, partially produced from 1979 to 1986. If it had been finished, it would have been the first film that was entirely 3D computer-animated. It included contributions from individuals who would go on to work at digital animation pioneers Pixar and DreamWorks Animation.

The film was developed by the staff of the Computer Graphics Lab in association with the New York Institute of Technology in Old Westbury, New York. The title itself was inspired by the original meaning of the word "robot", derived from "robota" (meaning "workforce" or "slaves"), a word found in Czech and many other Slavic languages. It was originally intended to be approximately 90 minutes long although less than 10 minutes are known to have been produced. A trailer for the film was screened at SIGGRAPH in Boston, Massachusetts in 1982. The project also resulted in other early computer animations such as 3DV, Sunstone, Inside a Quark and segments of the short film The Magic Egg from 1984.

The story is set in a future in which the human race has gone extinct on Earth because of The Works, a military supercomputer that then repopulated the entire planet with robots. Only scientist-astronauts survived and over two millennia created a new society on asteroids. One day the androids stationed on the Moon send them an ambassador, Ipso Facto, tasked with recruiting a human so that he can speak with The Works and obtain data about the former terrestrial civilisation. He encounters a boy, Beeper Raxis, who becomes his companion on the adventure.

== Plot ==
The story, written by Lance Williams, would have centered around "Ipso Facto", an elliptical robot, and a young female pilot nicknamed "T-Square". The story would have been set some time in the distant future after a malfunctioning computer, "The Works", triggered a devastating last World War but then, realizing what it had done, set out to repopulate the planet entirely with robots. T-Square, who works and lives in a nearby asteroid belt, vows to journey to Earth and fight[s] to make it safe to return to for her fellow space-faring humans. In the distant future, Earth is devastated by the Third World War. To stop it, a military "supercomputer" decides to collide an asteroid with the planet, causing the extinction of all humans. The only survivors are researchers who were on some planetoids conducting studies. Over two millennia, they found a new civilisation.

One day, T-Square and Beeper Raxis, two young spaceship pilots, notice the arrival of a spherical metallic object headed toward one of their "bubble cities". Assuming it might be a bomb sent from Earth to wipe out the last humans, Beeper decides to destroy it by ramming it. The impact actually only damages his craft, which is hurled into deep space. The metallic object instead proves to be a spacecraft piloted by a robot, who goes to rescue Beeper.

The android, named Ipso Facto, is an "expert on humans" and has been sent by Selene, the electronic brain of the Moon's scientific research centre, to recruit a living human who can speak with "The Works", the military "supercomputer" that, having gone mad after the end of the Third World War, tyrannises thousands of robots. The goal is to obtain from it all information relating to human progress, from the arts to science, including technology and medicine, so it can be given to the survivors. Selene had tried several times to speak with The Works, receiving only threats and attempted attacks via nuclear missiles in response.

Beeper accepts the mission. During the journey he is transferred to another spacecraft with which he connects to The Works, which at first does not believe he is human, considering him a robot assembled by Selene to steal its data. Nevertheless, it provides landing coordinates, intending to capture him and extract his memory, in order to obtain useful information about plans devised by its "enemy". When Beeper and Ipso enter the Earth's atmosphere, they are hit by laser beams. They manage to land, but their spacecraft can no longer depart. The boy also moves with great difficulty because of gravity and is forced to wear a special stabilising suit. After leaving the craft, they push into the surrounding vegetation, heading for the central computer. Some robots arrive, tasked with disassembling the visitors: Ipso attempts to convince them that his travelling companion is a genuine Homo sapiens, but they do not believe him, since the stabilising suit and helmet make the youth resemble them. Ipso is therefore forced to display impressive fighting techniques, destroying his opponents one after another.

As they cross an architectural complex under construction, they are intercepted by the Dinosaur Squadron, a group of newly manufactured flying discs that join to form a gigantic Tyrannosaurus rex. Ipso tries to fight it, but is dismantled piece by piece and placed in metal boxes. Beeper, hiding in one of the buildings, follows the vehicles transporting his friend to a pyramidal structure, a kind of warehouse. He gets lost in corridors full of piled-up objects, but eventually finds Ipso Facto and rebuilds him. The pair are confronted by some androids and the Dinosaur Squadron: Ipso manages to neutralise some flying discs and to repurpose one of them, enabling their escape. Outside the building, a tripod robot hits them with a laser beam and they fall into the sea, where they are swallowed by the water and disappear from the pursuers' sight and radar.

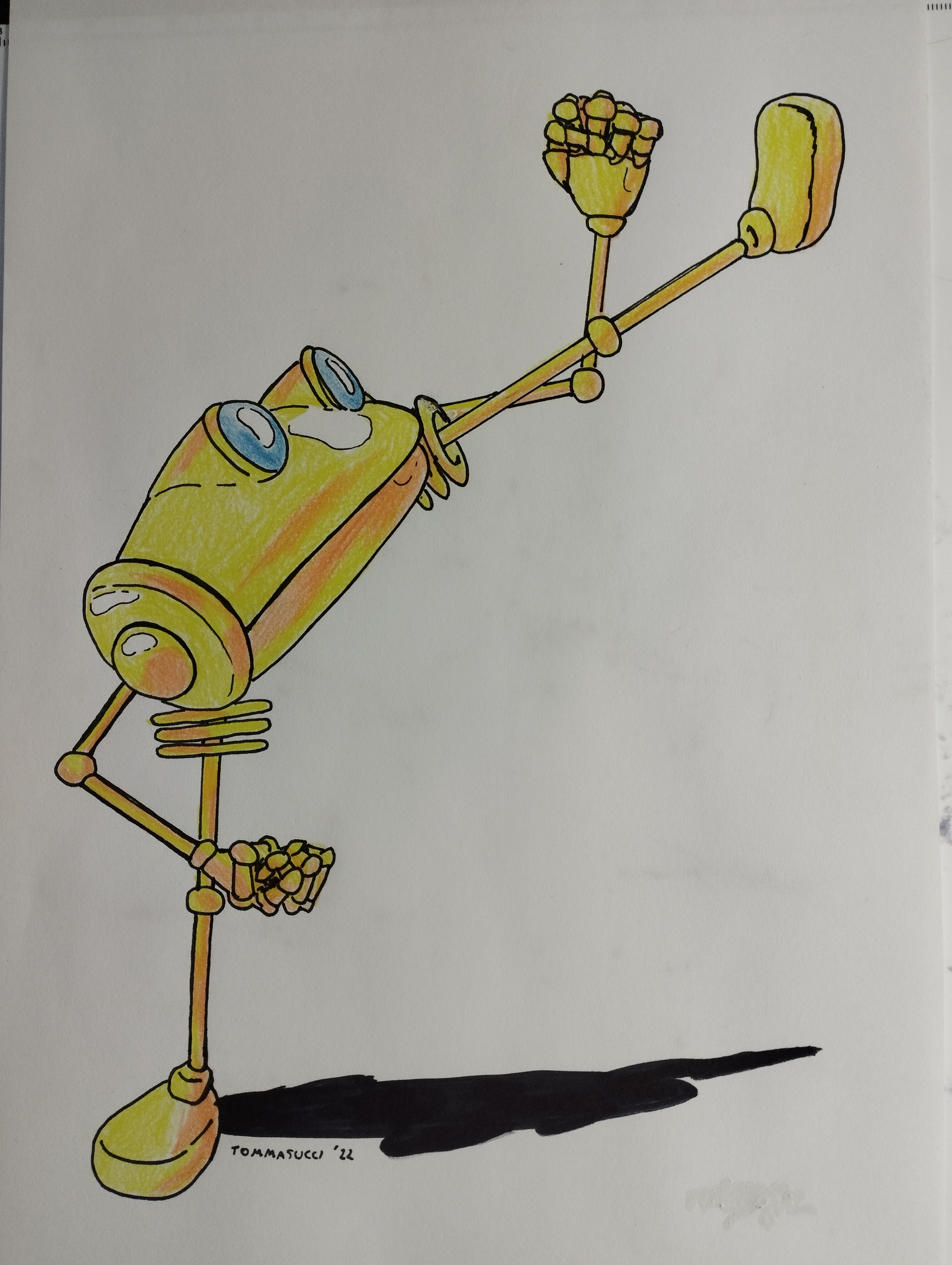
Fan art of Ipso Facto performing a karate move

Beeper and Ipso Facto wash up on a beach near a landfill; there, Ipso, although missing a hand, repairs a discarded robot. The robot recognises the boy as a human because, being very old, it had actually dealt with humans, unlike newer machines. Asked how to reach The Works, it does not know and directs them toward other machines playing poker. Ipso joins the game and, as the stake, offers Beeper himself, advertising him as a tireless and very strong slave. Despite the boy's fears, Ipso wins game after game, eventually obtaining from one of the opponents, Rusty, its memory. From this, Ipso learns that reaching the central computer requires some heavy unit. Beeper notices a huge ant-shaped vehicle stopped in the road; they board it and set it in motion. Ipso's hand, washed up from the sea, follows them from afar.

With the ant vehicle, they reach a large ventilation duct that leads them inside The Works, a vast complex of machinery and metal structures. Ipso and Beeper are surrounded by military androids, clamped by steel pincers and an immobilising beam. The Works is ready to dismantle them, but Ipso's hand, having slipped into the structure, presses a button that turns the paralysing antenna, striking The Works. All the androids shut down.

Beeper asks Ipso for help, but Ipso, deactivated, cannot respond. However, a spark of life, triggered by the boy's voice, revives him. With his strength, Ipso breaks the clamps, freeing his companion, who, injured, bleeds. The Works notices the blood, understands that he is a real human, and is enthusiastic. Beeper asks why it is happy to see a member of a race it nearly exterminated; it answers that it had no choice: a rival computer possessed deadly bacteriological weapons, and the only way to defeat it was to drop an asteroid on Earth. In addition, The Works had been forced to kill those humans who had managed to survive because, contaminated by viruses released during the conflict, they were attempting to reach the researchers on the asteroids. Beeper, realising that the machine acted for the good of his people, thanks it. He communicates with Selene, who informs everyone of the colonists' imminent arrival, led by T-Square.

== Pre-production ==
=== Background ===
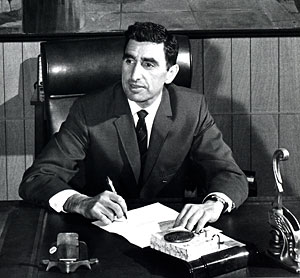
Alexander Schure, founder of the New York Institute of Technology and the Computer Graphics Lab

The New York Institute of Technology (NYIT) was founded in 1955 by entrepreneur and academic Alexander Schure, described as an "eccentric, fast-talking millionaire". Across its two campuses, one in Old Westbury (on Long Island) and the other in Manhattan, students were guided into technological and scientific research fields. Through creative teaching methods, the university promoted education for less privileged youth; for example, learning mathematics through comics was tested to help first-year students who were struggling. The idea met with some success and Schure wanted to turn the drawings into an animated product for educational purposes, pursuing one of his great passions: Schure had a long and ardent interest in animation. He was a great admirer of Walt Disney and was reported to have dreamed of making animated features. After winning a gold medal at the New York International TV Film Festival, he decided to open the Department of Animation, Visual Arts Center and Tech Sound Lab at the Old Westbury campus. Schure had already created a traditional animation facility at NYIT. After visiting the University of Utah and seeing the potential of computer technology in the form of the drawing program Sketchpad created by Ivan Sutherland, he told his people to pore over the Utah research center and "get him one of everything they had". In 1974 Schure announced that he would direct and produce an animated feature film, Tubby the Tuba, inspired by the children's song of the same name (1945) by Paul Tripp and George Kleinsinger. "He hired a hundred animators [...] but soon realised that drawing every frame by hand was a tedious process", so he began looking for means and resources that could speed up production. David C. Evans of Evans & Sutherland persuaded him to visit the computer graphics laboratories at the University of Utah. As Michael Morrison recounted in his essay Becoming a Computer Animator (1994): "After seeing the situation at the UU, he asked Evans what equipment he needed to create computer graphics. He told his people to 'bring me one of everything they have'". Ed Catmull, who had just earned a PhD in computer science and found work at the computer manufacturer Applicon, was contacted by Schure with a proposal to come to NYIT "to create an independent research lab, hire a team, buy whatever equipment they needed, with no constraints, just to develop a major technology" that could help animators produce cartoons.

And so in 1974 the NYIT Computer Graphics Lab (CGL) was established, buying state-of-the-art equipment and hiring major researchers from throughout the computer graphics field. The CGL was established at Old Westbury, headed by Catmull. He was joined by his friend and colleague Malcolm Blanchard. In the following months, two former employees of the Xerox Palo Alto Research Center, Alvy Ray Smith and David DiFrancesco, learned of the project from a University of Utah consultant, Martin Newell: Smith had worked with Richard Shoup on the digital colouring program SuperPaint; after being laid off, he spent his last savings to fly to NYIT from Berkeley, California. He and DiFrancesco were immediately hired as "Information Quanta".

At first, one of CGL's main goals was to use computers to produce 2D animation and invent tools to assist traditional animators in their work. Schure reasoned that it should be possible to develop technology that would make the animation process cheaper and faster. An early version of the CAPS system later used by Disney animators was among the tools created. Over time the lab expanded its staff, bringing in, among others, the visual artist Ed Emshwiller and the programmers and researchers Lance Williams, Jim Blinn, James H. Clark, Tom Duff, Ralph Guggenheim, Garland Stern, Fred Parke and Christy Barton, many of whom came from the University of Utah. Schure imposed no spending limits and managed to acquire the best commercial equipment available, such as a PDP-11 and a VAX from Digital Equipment Corporation, as well as the latest LDS-1 model and the "first random-access framebuffer" from Evans & Sutherland.

In 1975 Tubby the Tuba was completed, but during early test screenings in Manhattan it proved to be a failure. As Safi Bachall reported in Loonshots: How to Nurture the Crazy Ideas That Win Wars, Cure Diseases, and Transform Industries:

At the end of the screening, one of the film's animators quietly said, "Oh God, I've wasted two years of my life." Catmull described the film as a train wreck. The production was amateurish. Catmull and Smith [...] recognized that Schure would be no Walt Disney [...].

Upon recognizing its potential, the Lab's focus shifted to 3D computer graphics, and when Lance Williams presented his story, "The Works", the idea was to attempt to make it as a 3D computer-animated feature. This project became the center of attention at NYIT CGL.

Aside from personal and professional motivation, the practical reason behind the project was to continue to develop patentable tools while demonstrating what computer animation could accomplish for the entertainment industry. The arrival of "The Works" would have been the beginning of a new animation genre. Interested representatives from movie studios and television networks regularly toured the lab as did musicians Laurie Anderson and Peter Gabriel, puppeteer Jim Henson and animation legends Chuck Jones and Shamus Culhane.

Many staff members contributed designs and modeled characters and sets under the coordination of art director Bil Maher who created blueprint-style designs for T-Square and many of the 25 robots called for by the script. Dick Lundin, known for exhaustive and elaborate creations, designed and animated a mining ship and the gigantic robot "Ant".

Going into the project Schure had been aware of the challenges and potential for success and consistently provided extensive resources to aid the research and development of the necessary technologies. He believed his staff would work best if they were constantly being supplied with the latest computer hardware. However, this meant that his staff would regularly have to upgrade their systems, convert existing programs, and rework familiar tools for use on new machines, delaying production significantly.

=== Development ===
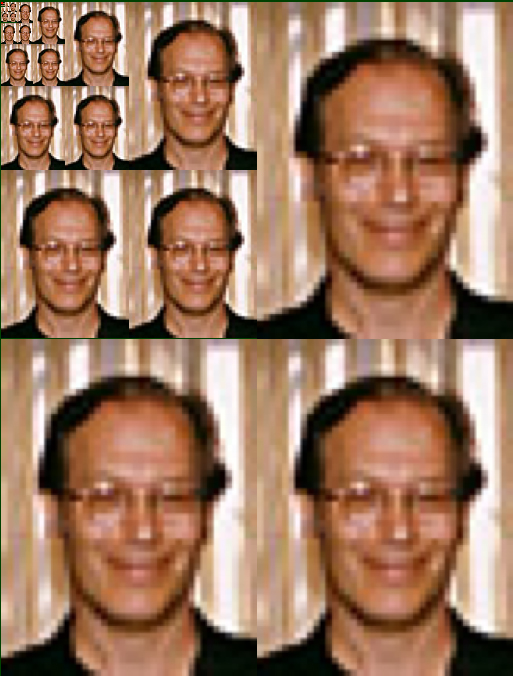
Lance Williams (shown here in a photo with a mipmap effect), senior researcher at the Computer Graphics Lab and creator of The Works.

Despite the failure of Tubby the Tuba, the CGL "thrived in a pioneering spirit, creating milestones in many areas of graphics software". For example, Williams invented the mipmap, Catmull the alpha channel and Tween (2D animation software that automatically produced inbetweening between two frames), Smith developed Paint (the first RGB drawing program), and Stern developed a scanning-and-paint system that later became the basis of the Computer Animation Production System used by Walt Disney Animation Studios.

In 1979 George Lucas asked Catmull to lead a group of researchers to bring computer graphics, video editing and digital audio into entertainment, making him a vice president at Industrial Light & Magic, a division of Lucasfilm. Smith and DiFrancesco joined him. Leadership of the CGL was assumed by Louis Schure, Alexander's son, under whose guidance the lab began focusing its efforts on three-dimensional animation.

In that same period Lance Williams, a senior researcher since 1978, submitted a screenplay he had written titled The Works, imagining a distant future in which robots had replaced humanity on Earth following a devastating war. Schure liked the concept and decided to produce it, with the goal not only of creating the first fully computer-animated feature film, but also of "improving the cinematic medium as we know it". More broadly, the science-fiction concept excited the entire CGL, because the genre on the one hand fit the environment of computer labs, while on the other it encouraged creative and technological research. Williams himself, who would also direct the film, said:

I'll admit it's hard to work on a project for this long without degenerating into cliches, especially when you talk about science fiction, a genre in which plots are frequently recycled. However, I think it's an interesting genre to work in; it's more playful than other forms. In some respects, it is the most modern literature.

==== Technology ====
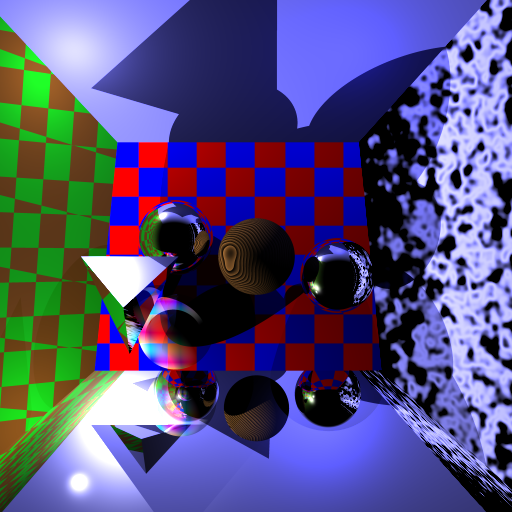
Image produced with ray tracing with anti-aliasing, 3D projection, reflection mapping and fractal textures. Some of these effects were tested during the production of The Works.

From the outset The Works was regarded as an ambitious and unprecedented project. CGL staff had to develop ever-different programs, optimising them with the best hardware components in terms of speed and performance, in order to create and animate 3D models. There was no single leadership, since the entire staff contributed ideas and suggestions that built on what came before:

It just grew and grew and grew. No matter what came before, someone always had something more to add, there was always something more to do on the project.

— Lance Williams

Many inventions emerged during work on the film. Williams experimented with new z-buffering techniques and, with Heckbert and Parke, wrote a dedicated program for facial animation; with Ned Greene he designed polygon-mesh modelling software. In collaboration with Jules Bloomenthal, who had independently written an application for realistic tree shaping, he created DEKINK, a recording and anti-aliasing tool, and while assisting Heckbert he computed the Coons image warping. Duff wrote MAT with Blinn, a 3D modelling language for yacc, and on his own SOID, a renderer for quadric surfaces with z-buffer featuring texture mapping and bump mapping (to which Mike Chou added a reflection mapping capability between 1982 and 1983). Ephraim Cohen developed ZOOM and EPT, respectively a filtered image resampling program and a painting tool. Dick Lundin completed several 3D creation tools.

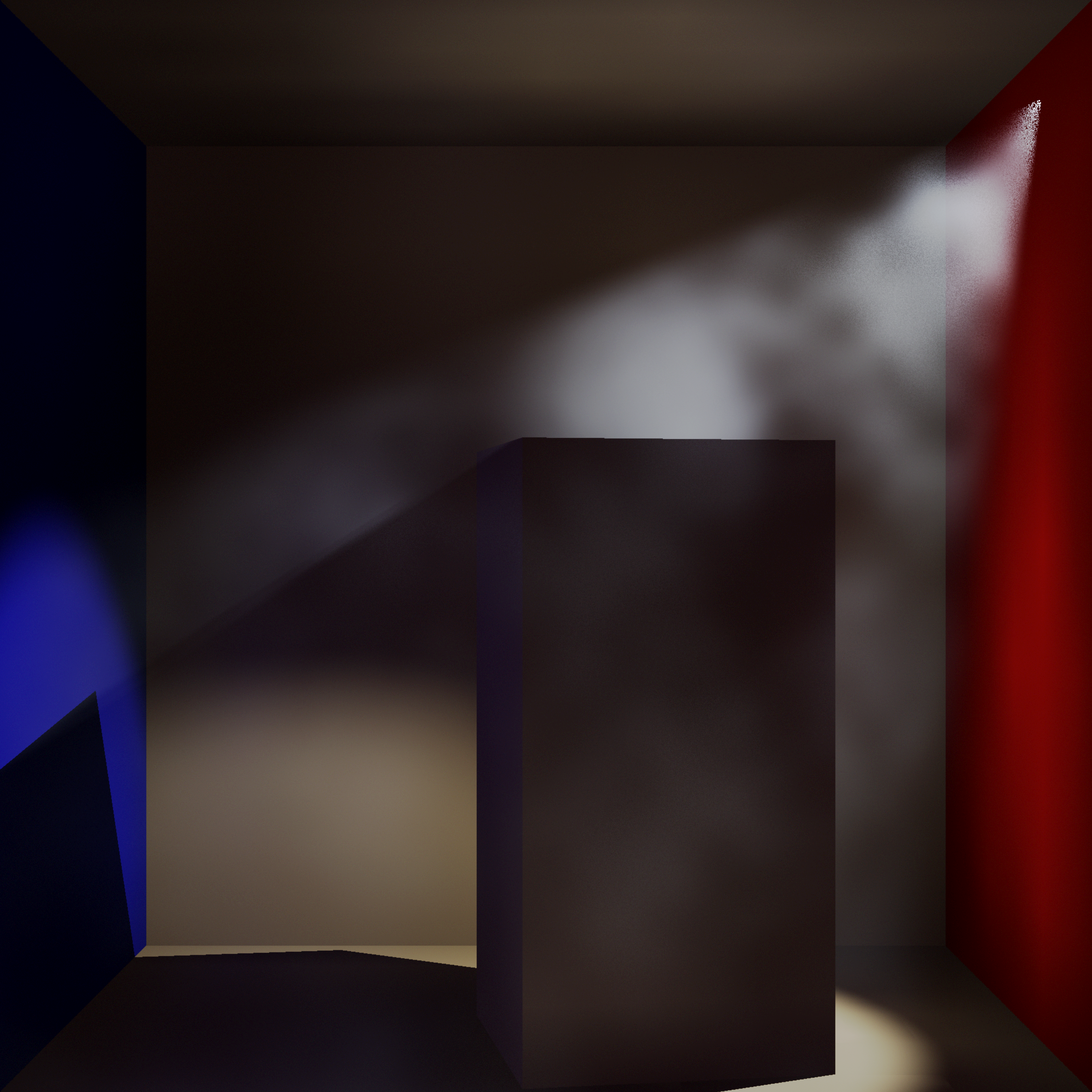
Representation of a 3D model using volume rendering and beam tracing

Heckbert created POLY (a polygon processor with z-buffer and texture mapping) and an early form of volume rendering known as splatting; with Pat Hanrahan he devised beam tracing and with Greene a z-buffer renderer for fish-eye projections. Hanrahan created a new winged edge library and an interactive modelling program, EM. He also led a project to build a laser device capable of scanning 3D models directly into the computer. John Lewis and Peter Oppenheimer programmed a fractal modelling system, while Greene wrote another capable of recreating skies from photographs. Stern produced the interactive key frame animation system BBOP and Thad Beier produced SSOID, to use constructive solid geometry on quadric surfaces. Important contributions to digital drawing, image morphing and computer animation came from Andrew Glassner, Franklin C. Crow, Tom Brigham, John Schlag, David Sturnam, Kevin Hunter, Tom Shermer and Robert McDermott. Finally, Tracy Petersen, director of the Digital Sound Lab, together with Carter Burwell and Mike Kowalski, experimented with new audio synthesis systems, such as cross synthesis, which, through vector processors, could synchronise sound and image with high precision.

Because transferring work to film stock was extremely laborious for the CGL, animation experiments were conducted only via videotape:

With three-dimensional video, the turnaround time is much quicker and the costs are much lower than using film. This affords us greater opportunity to experiment. We aren't as limited in our trial-and-error process. Also, video allows us to combine live action with computer animation which plays an important role in The Works.

— Lance Williams

==== Character design and animation ====
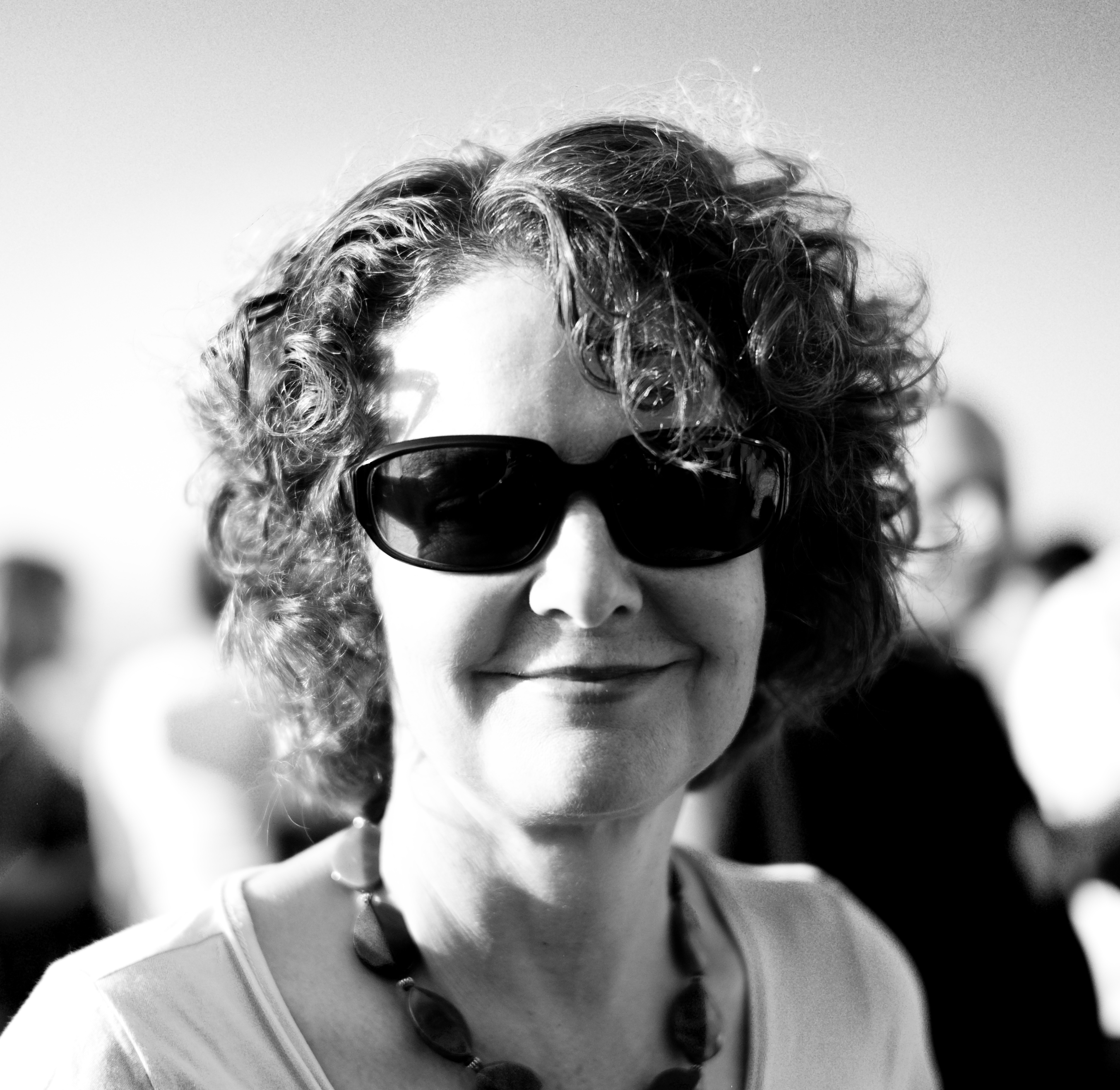
Rebecca Allen, one of the film's animators

New researchers and programmers were recruited for The Works, including digital artists Rebecca Allen and Amber Denker, who worked on the animation. Twenty-five robots were planned to appear in the film; the design team was led by Bill Maher, previously a cartoonist, car designer and publicist, assisted by Williams, Greene, Burwell and Lundin. Lundin in particular tackled the complex creation of a mechanical ant, drawing on his mechanical engineering studies and designing "some really elaborate and beautifully complex mathematical models". Maher created smooth reflective textures and "highly stylised" robots that expressed "his taste for combining building blocks, light sources and shading code from geometric solid modelling".

No one produced sketches or preliminary studies; characters were created directly with a rudimentary graphics tablet connected to the computers' database or with 3D modelling software. The robots were composited over photographs to check reflection mapping quality. In 1985 Williams, Greene and Burwell moved to video tests, shooting a 17-second short titled Interface, in which a woman, played by Ginevra Walker, kisses an android goodnight after telling him she would be going out and that he should not wait up for her. It was "the first use in animation of photo-based reflection mapping, and also its first use to help tell a story". A second short allowed Petersen to demonstrate advances in digital sound research, showing subtle motion between the mouths of two robots, one male and one female. Helping Handroid, which advertised a robot waiter, was another video experiment emphasising movement differences between a mechanical man and a human being. Maher admitted that "after a while using this technology, they [the robots] look really real. You live with them day and night. They're constantly in your mind".

Animators aimed to give characters fluid, realistic motion and used Catmull's Tween, which automatically created inbetweens between positions. T-Square was the most difficult and complex to animate, because she needed to express genuine human emotions; this required facial and bodily articulations completely different from those of the robots. The staff also found designing her spacesuit challenging; unlike the other designs, it took "twelve design passes" and many days of work:

T-Square's glove, for instance, was so complex as to be equal to creating a whole separate character. We wanted her hand and fingers to move like a human's, a very complex job.

— Bill Maher

==== SIGGRAPH presentations ====
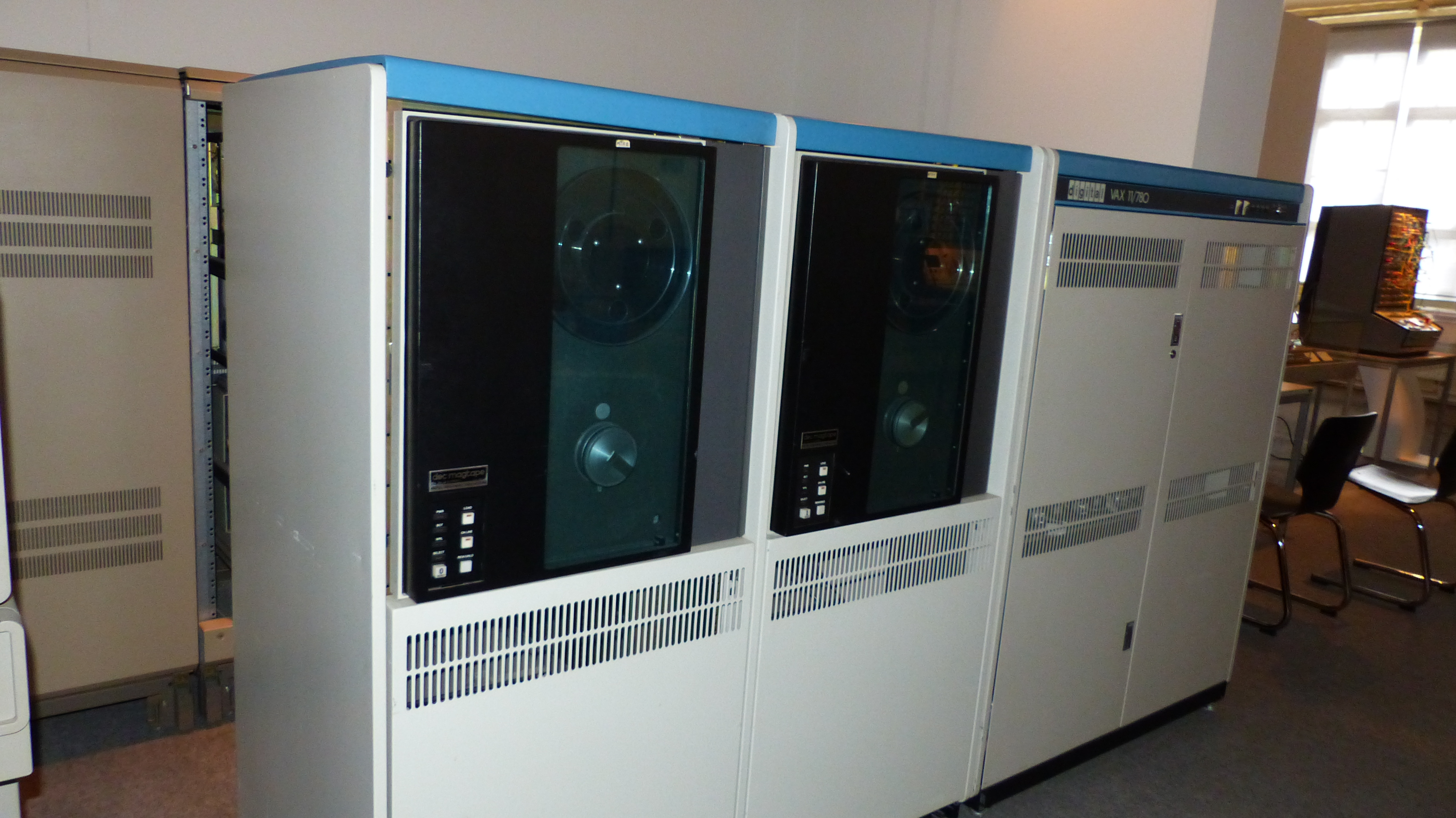
A VAX 11/780, a mainframe model used by the CGL in the 1980s

At SIGGRAPH computer graphics conferences, the CGL presented prints showcasing technological results achieved during production of The Works. At the eighth edition, held in Dallas in 1981, Allen and McDermott presented Kick, showing a 3D model of a woman kicking in the air; Heckbert presented Eye Planes, an overlay of polygons textured with a photo of an open eye, and Dome with VW, in which an android stands next to a car in a geometric environment. Blinn proposed two graphical representations of Uranus and Venus (Uranus from Voyager and Venus Topography), while Williams and Lundin presented a view of the robot ant with Ipso Facto called Robot Ant with Ipso.

In 1982, in Boston, Williams and Lundin showed an image produced with a Heckbert program installed on a VAX 11/780, titled Saxobone, depicting an unusual musical instrument resembling a disassembled saxophone in its case. Greene presented Night Castles, also produced on the VAX 11/780, illustrating a composite 3D model of a castle by the sea with polygon shading and textures. The following year, in Detroit, Greene presented Mondo Condo, produced with software written by Heckbert, Duff, Oppenheimer and Williams; it shows two robots observing pyramidal constructions against a rocky background.

At one of the events, a trailer for The Works was especially acclaimed; featuring Patrick Moraz's track Impact, it showed some robots in motion, space battles, anthropomorphic models fighting or swimming, polygon faces and a "dazzling red mask" that was to be the "evil dictatorial computer network". As Sarah Philip noted in her article The CGI film that was ten years ahead of Toy Story, "the audience was extremely impressed by the film's cutting-edge graphics. This was the first time anyone had released film clips showing extensive texture mapping, environment mapping and 3D character animation". Media outlets such as Time, Cinefantastique, Newsweek and Byte covered the event.

== Production difficulties ==
While progress on The Works did manage to significantly advance the field of computer animation, the film itself was in development hell for nearly a decade and eventually abandoned for several reasons. The staff was composed almost entirely of technical experts, such as engineers and programmers, with directors and editors considered unnecessary. When NYIT, with Schure as a director, produced a 2D feature known as Tubby the Tuba, the film did poorly and lessened their confidence in their ability to produce a film that would succeed critically or financially. The lukewarm reception of Disney's Tron, which used computer graphics heavily, added to the group's doubts.

By the time The Works was in production, the field of computer graphics had become competitive. George Lucas also recognized the potential of computer animation, and in 1979, created a new department of Lucasfilm which had the same goals as CGL, but ensured that movie industry professionals had a hand in the production. As Lucasfilm began headhunting for the best talent in the industry, many individuals struggling on The Works felt that Lucasfilm was a company more likely to succeed and abandoned NYIT. Cornell University was another competitor, and NYIT lost some of its staff to the institution.

The computer systems themselves also became a major problem. While the most powerful hardware at the time, they were too slow and underpowered to generate the number of images required for a theatrical film. Attempting to pick up the pace, the NYIT Computer Graphics Lab kept hiring, having more than 60 employees at its peak. As a way to generate funds, a portion of the team did work-for-hire for advertisers. This, however, meant having to balance production on a feature film, the tools needed and client work. Researcher Ned Greene analyzed all the elements needed to finish the film with devastating results: with the technology available, it would take seven years to output the rendered frames needed.

== Abandonment of the project ==
Although Schure imposed no limits on time or budget, after several years the CGL was forced to abandon The Works. First, the staff lacked filmmaking professionals such as directors or editors:

We were just a bunch of engineers in a little converted stable on Long Island, and we didn't know the first thing about making movies.

— Thad Beier

Second, because of the technology of the time (unable to process the very large number of images, sequences and animations needed for a 90-minute film), production reached a standstill, prolonging timelines and driving up costs, which already amounted to several million dollars. The lack of clear direction led many staff to leave NYIT labs to work either at Industrial Light & Magic or at Cornell University, which from the late 1970s had launched a research programme in computer animation for entertainment arts. In 1986 Schure decided to suspend The Works permanently.

Once it had been shown that the film could not be realized on available hardware, The Works was officially abandoned. A less ambitious project, 3DV, was attempted. In a bid to circumvent the filmmaking bottleneck, 3DV was intended to be a TV special with a script that would include footage originally intended for The Works repurposed as programming for an imaginary all-computer generated cable TV service. 3DV incorporated some of its own innovations like 3D lip-synching and compositing a CG character into a live-action scene but, other than a promotional edit which was shown at SIGGRAPH, this too was abandoned.

== Cultural legacy ==
Logo of Pixar Animation Studios

While The Works was never finished or released and therefore it can be considered a failed project, it was regarded as revolutionary for the advances it enabled in 3D modelling and animation. These developments and inventions already bore fruit in productions parallel to the film. For example, in 1981 Allen, using Beier and Heckbert's software, created the opening sequence for the CBS popular science programme Walter Cronkite's Universe, described as "a very early use of 3D computer animation in a television title sequence", which won her an Emmy Award for Outstanding Individual Achievement in Animation. In 1984 Maher, Lundin, Williams, Allen and Burwell worked on 3DV, a half-hour TV special starring two CGI-animated hosts, User Friendly and Dot Matrix. Presented at SIGGRAPH, it inspired Annabel Jankel and Rocky Morton in creating Max Headroom for the TV series of the same name, a computer-generated reporter portrayed by actor Matt Frewer. That same year, the CGL team contributed to the OMNIMAX short The Magic Egg, sponsored by Nelson Max and SIGGRAPH organisers Dick Weinberg and Dick Mueller and screened at the July conference in Minneapolis. Despite some issues related to slow devices, the work was completed and Heckbert judged it "a fantastic collage of computer animation".

What was developed at the Computer Graphics Lab passed into the hands of various film studios, both in Silicon Valley and New York, which hosted some of Schure's former employees. In 1985 Heckbert went to Pacific Data Images, Bloomenthal to Xerox PARC and Hanrahan to Digital Equipment Corporation. The following year Williams went first to Jim Henson Productions and then, in 1988, to Apple.

In 1986 Walt Disney Pictures produced the film Flight of the Navigator, directed by Randal Kleiser, in which reflection mapping was used for the first time to make the protagonist's spacecraft glossy and reflective. James Cameron would also use it a few years later for The Abyss (1989) and Terminator 2: Judgment Day (1991). Some CGL programmers and animators joined Catmull and Smith's Pixar, which in 1995 saw the release of the first ever feature-length film entirely in CGI, Toy Story, finally achieving the milestone NYIT had sought.

== See also ==
- History of computer science

== Bibliography ==
- Williams, Lance (1978). "The Works". The Works (archived script) (Screenplay). "The film's screenplay, written in 1978, does not appear to have been officially published. A scanned version was uploaded online in November 2021 by the YouTuber known as "Maximized Animation", who contacted Lance Williams' wife. The script was later transcribed as a plain text file."
- Prince, Suzan D. (March–April 1983). "Projects: Inside The Works". Computer Pictures.
- Allen, Rebecca; Huhtamo, Erkki (2003). Judy Malloy (ed.). Women, Art & Technology. Leonardo. The MIT Press. ISBN 0-262-13424-1.
- Catmull, Edwin; Wallace, Amy (2014). Creativity Inc.: Overcoming the Unseen Forces That Stand in the Way of True Inspiration. New York: Random House. ISBN 978-0-8129-9301-1. OCLC 851419994.
