= New York Institute of Technology Computer Graphics Lab =

Computer lab

Coordinates: 40°48′45.52″N 73°36′27.15″W

- Industry: Computer animation
- Founded: 1974; 52 years ago
- Founder: Alexander Schure

The New York Institute of Technology Computer Graphics Lab is a computer lab located at the New York Institute of Technology (NYIT), founded by Alexander Schure. It was originally located at the "pink building" on the NYIT campus. It has played an important role in the history of computer graphics and animation, as founders of Pixar and Lucasfilm Limited, including Turing Award winners Edwin Catmull and Patrick Hanrahan, began their research there. It is the birthplace of entirely 3D CGI films.

The lab was initially founded to produce a short high-quality feature film with the project name of The Works. The feature, which was never completed, was a 90-minute feature that was to be the first entirely computer-generated CGI movie. Production mainly focused around DEC PDP and VAX machines.

Many of the original CGL team now form the elite of the CG and computer world with members going on to Silicon Graphics, Microsoft, Cisco, NVIDIA and others, including Pixar president, co-founder and Turing laureate Ed Catmull, Pixar co-founder and Microsoft graphics fellow Alvy Ray Smith, Pixar co-founder Ralph Guggenheim, Walt Disney Animation Studios chief scientist Lance Williams, Netscape and Silicon Graphics founder Jim Clark, Tableau co-founder and Turing laureate Pat Hanrahan, Microsoft graphics fellow Jim Blinn, Thad Beier, Oscar and Bafta nominee Jacques Stroweis, Andrew Glassner, and Tom Brigham. Systems programmer Bruce Perens went on to co-found the Open Source Initiative.

Researchers at the New York Institute of Technology Computer Graphics Lab created the tools that made entirely 3D CGI films possible. Among NYIT CG Lab's many innovations was an eight-bit paint system to ease computer animation. NYIT CG Lab was regarded as the top computer animation research and development group in the world during the late 70s and early 80s.

== The 21st century ==
The lab is presently located at NYIT's Long Island campus, and NYIT currently offers a Ph.D. program in Computer Science.
