= Creativity, Inc. =

2014 book by Edwin Catmull and Amy Wallace

Creativity, Inc.: Overcoming the Unseen Forces That Stand in the Way of True Inspiration
- Paperback edition
- Authors: Edwin Catmull and Amy Wallace
- Language: English
- Genre: Business, economics
- Publisher: Transworld Publishers Limited
- Publication date: April 8, 2014
- Publication place: United States
- Media type: Print
- Pages: 320
- ISBN: 978-0552167260
- Website: www.creativityincbook.com

Creativity, Inc.: Overcoming the Unseen Forces That Stand in the Way of True Inspiration is a 2014 book written by Edwin Catmull, co-founder of Pixar, and Amy Wallace, about managing creativity in business.

== Background ==
In the book, Catmull describes growing up idolizing Walt Disney, as well as moving to and growing up in Utah as a child.

Despite his interests in animation, he pursued studies in math, physics, and computer science in college, as a PhD student at the University of Utah.

Eventually, this led him to pursue a graduate degree under Ivan Sutherland, the "father of computer graphics," also at the University of Utah. Decades before computer animation existed, Catmull began developing the programming required to create 2D and 3D computer graphics. During this time, he was recruited by Lucasfilm, becoming vice president of Industrial Light and Magic's computer graphics division. In 1986, Steve Jobs bought the division and co-founded Pixar Animation Studios with Catmull and John Lasseter. There, Catmull soon became Chief Technical Officer.

== Reception ==
The New York Times said, "Catmull's book is quickly becoming the latest bible for the show business crowd." The book has also garnered positive reviews from The Wall Street Journal, Publishers Weekly, and Financial Times.
