= Alexander Schure =

American academic (1920–2009)

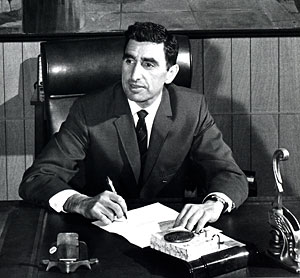
- Born: August 3, 1920
- Died: October 29, 2009 (aged 89); Long Island, New York
- Occupation(s): Academic and entrepreneur
- Spouse: Gail

Alexander Schure (August 3, 1920 – October 29, 2009) was an American academic and entrepreneur. Schure founded the New York Institute of Technology (NYIT) in 1955. He also served as the Chancellor of Nova Southeastern University (NSU) from 1970 until 1985.

== Education ==
He received doctoral degrees in engineering and education from New York University.

== Career ==
Schure is credited with saving Nova University, which was in deep financial trouble, after he became the school's chancellor in 1970. The university is now called Nova Southeastern University, and is now the largest private university in Florida, with more than 28,000 students as of 2009.

Schure and then-Nova University President Abraham Fischler, Ed.D., formed a federation between Nova and the New York Institute of Technology. The partnership between the two institutions brought money and new programs to Nova University. The money from NYIT allowed Nova University to remain open during its financial difficulties. The alliance between NYIT and Nova University ended in 1985.

When Schure founded NYIT, the university had open admissions intended to promote education of the underprivileged. Because many of these students struggled with math, he hired a comic book artist that could draw the math lessons for them. This approach seemed successful, so Schure got the idea to convert the drawn lessons into an animated educational film which won a gold medal in the New York International TV film festival. Encouraged by the success, he wanted to go further with animation and decided to write, direct and produce a feature called Tubby the Tuba. What he hadn't realized was how time consuming and painstaking it would be to do each frame by hand, which inspired him to use modern computer technology to help with the animation process. This technology did not exist yet, and so had to be created first.

In November 1974 Schure hired recent University of Utah doctoral graduate Edwin Catmull to direct NYIT's fledgling computer graphics lab, and ensured that the lab received special funding for more than 5 years. In 1979 Catmull left to form a computer-graphics group with Lucasfilm and the core technical team—including computer animation pioneers Alvy Ray Smith, David DiFrancesco, Ralph Guggenheim, Jim Blinn, and Jim Clark—came from the NYIT lab. (In 1986, that computer-graphics group would be funded by recently fired Steve Jobs as the independent company Pixar which manufactured and sold image-processing computers using the concepts first developed at NYIT, and also produced projects using them.)

Although Clark would move on to found Silicon Graphics and Netscape, the rest of the NYIT team continued to play key roles as Pixar's animation developed from its first short films in the mid-1980s onward. It can be said that Dr. Schure's vision and support from 1975 to 1980, and the low-pressure academic research lab environment at NYIT, was an essential contributor to the development of many of the technical innovations needed to produce realistic computer generated films. He funded the computers and frame buffers used in the making of the unfinished computer-generated film "The Works".

== Death ==
Alexander Schure died from complications of Alzheimer's disease on Long Island on October 29, 2009, at the age of 89. He was survived by his second wife, Gail; and four children - Dr. Barbara Schure Weinschel, Dr. Matthew Schure (1948-2023), Louis Schure, and Dr. Jonathan Schure. Following his death, former NSU president Fischler said Schure "was a brilliant individual with a very creative mind. He was an excellent friend to me and the university. There would be no NSU without him."
