= Pixar Photoscience Team =

- Industry: Computer animation
- Founded: 1979; 47 years ago
- Founder: David DiFrancesco

The Pixar Photoscience Division, a division of Pixar Animation Studios, was founded in 1979 at Lucasfilm for the express purpose of designing and building a laser recorder/scanner system to input and output film to a computer for compositing and color correction of special effects. In the early years of Pixar's history, the team was responsible for the design of color monitoring instrumentation to control the color gamut and gamma of the digital images onto 35mm film using a more advance laser recorder system called PixarVision. In later years at Pixar, the team was responsible for transforming the artists computer-animated images onto film master negatives. Today the team manages all digital content to a variety of delivery media, film, DVD, and digital cinema projection. The team has won Engineering and Technical Academy Awards and patents for their work in Motion Picture Sciences.

== Key People ==
- David DiFrancesco Director of Photosciences
- Beth Sullivan Administration Manager
- Matt Martin Hardware/Software Engineer
- Tom Noggle Hardware/Software Engineer
- James Burgess Software Engineer
- Don Conway Technician
- Babak Sanii Software Instrumentation Engineer
- John Shlens Software Instrumentation Engineer

== Consultants ==
- Gary Starkweather
- Bala S. Manian
- Peter Flowers

== Awards ==
- Academy of Motion Pictures Arts and Sciences Scientific and Technical Achievement Award, 1998
- Academy of Motion Pictures Arts and Sciences Scientific and Technical Achievement Award, 1994
- Royal Photographic Society ARPS, 1985
- National Endowment for the Arts Fellowship, 1979
- National Endowment for the Arts Fellowship, 1977
- National Endowment for the Arts Fellowship, 1975
- National Endowment for the Arts Fellowship, 1974

== Patents ==
- 5,194,969 Method for Borderless Mapping of Texture Images
- 5,771,109 Method and Apparatus for Digitizing Film Using a Stroboscopic Scanning System
- 5,815,202 Method and Apparatus for Scanning an Image with a Moving Lens System
- 5,831,757 Multiple Cylinder Deflection System
- 6,172,705 Method and Apparatus for Film Scanner Interface
- 6,628,442 Method and Apparatus for Beam Deflection Using Multiple Beam Scanning Galvanometers
- 7,336,349 Two-Dimensional Array Spectroscopy
- 7,463,821 Flat Panel Image to Film Transfer Method and Apparatus
- 7,576,830 Configurable Flat Panel Image to Film Transfer Method and Apparatus
- 7,787,010 Video to Film Flat Panel Digital Recorder and Method
- 8,233,693 Automatic Print and Negative Verification Method and Apparatus
- 8,368,700 Animatronics Animation Method and Apparatus
- 8,502,909 Super Light-Field Lens
