= Bala S. Manian =

Indian-born Silicon Valley entrepreneur

Bala S. Manian is an Indian-born Silicon Valley entrepreneur who has started a string of medical technology companies such as ReaMetrix, Digital Optics and Quantum Dot Corporation. Some of the resulting technologies have also had applications in the film industry, earning Manian an Academy Award certificate for technical achievement.

== Early life ==
Bala Manian was born in Chennai (formerly Madras) India in 1944. He lost an eye in a childhood accident at age three and has seven siblings. His elder brother N. Vaghul has been chairman of ICICI Bank. Manian earned a BSc in physics from Loyola College, Madras and a postgraduate level diploma in instrumentation from the Madras Institute of Technology at Madras before earning a Master in optics at the University of Rochester. He then earned a PhD from Purdue in 1971, conducting research in the Applied Optics Laboratory of the College of Engineering. From 1971 until 1974, Manian held a position as a senior research associate and assistant professor at the University of Rochester's Institute of Optics.

== Career ==
As a consultant for various companies, he helped develop the first compact "under the counter" barcode laser scanner for supermarkets, several laser scanner-based stereo mapping instruments at the Defense Mapping Agency and image quality control instrumentation for photo reconnaissance systems. He also consulted on computer vision for online quality control at several companies, including Ford, IBM, Corning, Kodak, and the Union Pacific Railroad.

Manian then founded various other companies Digital Optics Corporation, an optical instrumentation and systems development company, which developed the first three-color laser, film reader/writer system. These techniques allowed filmmakers to insert or merge special effects into movies using computerized digital imaging. Working with David DiFrancesco and Tom Noggle, he created a technology that was transferred in 1983 to Industrial Light and Magic. It has been used in the production of numerous movies, including "Indiana Jones and the Last Crusade" and "Return of the Jedi." In February 1999, Manian was awarded an Academy of Motion Picture Arts and Sciences Technical Award for this advance in technology. The same technology was then further developed to write the CAT scan and MRI images used in medical diagnosis directly onto film. This required a special film developed by Kodak for optimum results. Manian sold Digital Optics in 1984 for $7.5 million to the Matrix Corporation.

Manian remained as Chief Technical Officer for Digital Optics through 1985 and then acted as an investor and independent consultant to several venture capital firms before becoming the founder and Chief Technical Officer for two startups, Molecular Dynamics and Lumisys, a company dealing in laser-based x-ray film digitizers.

He then founded Biometric Imaging and became the Chief Technical Officer. The company has developed a technology that allows doctors to examine the blood cells of seriously ill patients and determine the nature and extent of their disease. It also gives pharmaceutical companies the ability to perform cell function analyses on the discovery and development of pharmaceutical drugs. Manian co-founded the company Surromed and Quantum Dot Corporation in 1998. Quantum Dot Corporation (QDC) developed and sold novel solutions to accelerate the discovery and development of functionally validated novel drug targets at the cellular level. QDC's products and services employ quantum dot (Qdot) particles. Bala Manian founded ReaMetrix in May 2003 and serves as a science and business advisor for a number of entrepreneurial companies (Galileo Labs, Biocon India, ICICI Knowledge Park and APIDC -VC). Currently, he is also an advisor to the startup TeliportMe.

== See also ==
- Pixar Photoscience Team
