= List of Pixar awards and nominations =

This is a list of awards that Pixar has won, or were nominated for.

== Feature films ==
Pixar has released 26 feature films with 210 awards won and 211 awards nominated. The films released are: Toy Story, A Bug's Life, Toy Story 2, Monsters, Inc., Finding Nemo, The Incredibles, Cars, Ratatouille, WALL-E, Up, Toy Story 3, Cars 2, Brave, Monsters University, Inside Out, The Good Dinosaur, Finding Dory, Cars 3, Coco, Incredibles 2, Toy Story 4, Onward, Soul, Luca, Turning Red, and Lightyear.

== Short films ==
With each feature film released on DVD or Blu-ray, Pixar releases a short film. The shorts received many awards.

== See also ==
- List of Pixar films
- List of Pixar shorts
