= Lance Williams (graphics researcher) =

American graphics researcher

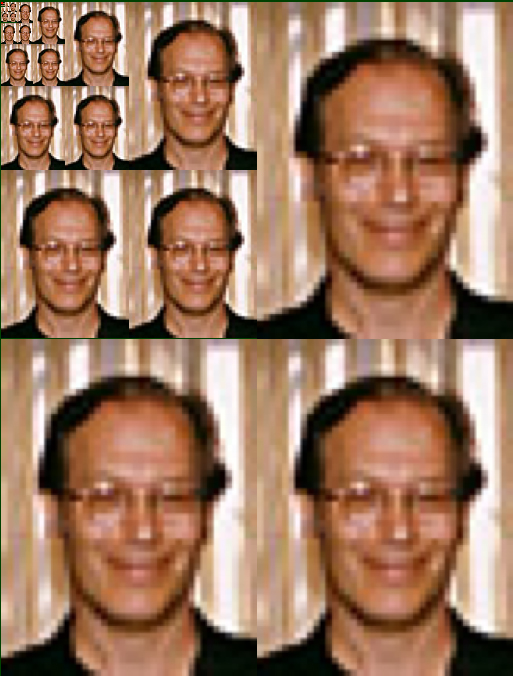
- An image of Lance Williams stored as a mipmap
- Born: September 25, 1949; Lawrence, Kansas, U.S.
- Died: August 20, 2017 (aged 67)
- Education: University of Kansas; University of Utah
- Scientific career
- Fields: Computer graphics

Lance J. Williams (September 25, 1949 – August 20, 2017) was a prominent graphics researcher who made major contributions to texture map prefiltering, shadow rendering algorithms, facial animation, and antialiasing techniques. Williams was one of the first people to recognize the potential of computer graphics to transform film and video making.

Williams died at 67 years old on August 20, 2017, after a battle with cancer. He is survived by his wife and two children.

== Education ==
Williams was an Honors student majoring in English with a minor in Asian Studies at the University of Kansas and graduated with a B.A. in 1972. While a student at KU he competed in collegiate chess tournaments and is said to have had a rating of 1800. He was drawn to the University of Utah by a "Humanistic Computation" summer seminar held by Jef Raskin at KU. He joined the graduate Computer Science program at the University of Utah in 1973 and studied computer graphics and animation under Ivan Sutherland, David Evans, and Steven Coons. At this time in the early 1970s, the University of Utah was the hub for much of the pioneering work being done in computer graphics. Lance left Utah (having completed his PhD course work and exams except the writing of a thesis) in 1977 to join the New York Institute of Technology (NYIT). While at NYIT, Williams invented the mipmapping technique for texture filtering, which is ubiquitously used today by graphics hardware for PCs and video games, and wrote and directed the abandoned project The Works which would have been the first entirely 3D CGI film had it been finished in the early 1980s as intended.

Williams was awarded his PhD in 2000 from the University of Utah based on a rule allowing someone who published three seminal papers in his field to bind them together as his thesis. The three papers are Casting Curved Shadows on Curved Surfaces (1978), Pyramidal Parametrics (1983) and View Interpolation for Image Synthesis (1993).

== Professional career ==
Williams worked at the New York Institute of Technology (NYIT) from 1976-1986 on research and commercial animation, and the development of shadow mapping and "mip" texture mapping. Williams, acting as lab director, was also the creator of The Works, a feature film project in development at the lab from roughly 1978-1982. The film was eventually canceled due to the lack of sufficient technology.

Subsequently Williams consulted for Jim Henson Associates, independently developed facial tracking for computer animation, worked for six years in Apple Computer's Advanced Technology Group starting in 1987. While there he collaborated with Eric Chen to pioneer early image based rendering work, developed "Virtual Integral Holography" (with Dan Venolia), created 3D paint systems and contributed to QuickTime VR. He has pioneered work in motion capture facial animation systems for over 20 years. In 1997, Williams joined DreamWorks SKG. In 2002 he became Chief Scientist at Walt Disney Animation Studios. In 2006, Williams joined Google and worked with the Google Geo Group (Maps and Earth). In 2008 he was a Principal Member of Research Staff at Nokia and as of 2012, he joined NVIDIA Research.

== Personal life ==
Williams married Amber Denker in 1992 and had two children.

== Publications ==
- “Shadows for Cel Animation," (with Adam Finkelstein et al.) Computer Graphics (SIGGRAPH 2000 Proceedings) 511-516.
- "Motion Signal Processing," (with Armin Bruderlin) Computer Graphics (SIGGRAPH '95 Proceedings) 97-104.
- "Animating Images with Line Drawings," (with Pete Litwinowicz) Computer Graphics (SIGGRAPH '94 Proceedings) 409-412.
- “View Interpolation Image Synthesis," (with Shenchang Eric Chen) Computer Graphics (SIGGRAPH '93 Proceedings) 279-288.
- "Living Pictures," (invited paper) Computer Animation '93, Switzerland, 1993.
- "Shading in Two Dimensions," Graphics Interface '91, Calgary, Alberta, 1991.
- "3D Paint," Computer Graphics 24, 2, 1990 Symposium on Interactive 3D Graphics, 1990.
- "Performance-Driven Facial Animation," Computer Graphics (SIGGRAPH '90 Proceedings) vol. 24, no. 4, 235-242.
- "Pyramidal Parametrics," Computer Graphics (SIGGRAPH '83 Proceedings) vol. 17, no 3, 1-11.
- "Casting Curved Shadows on Curved Surfaces," Computer Graphics (SIGGRAPH '78 Proceedings) vol. 12, no. 3, 270-274.

== Recognition ==
- 1971 - Five State Intercollegiate Chess Championship
- On August 15, 2001, Williams was presented the ACM SIGGRAPH Coons Award for Outstanding Creative Contributions to computer graphics.
- On March 2, 2002, Williams was awarded a 2001 Technical Achievement Award by the Academy of Motion Picture Arts and Sciences for "his pioneering influence in the field of computer-generated animation and effects for motion pictures."
- 2002 - Honorary Doctorate of Fine Arts, Columbus College of Art and Design.
