= Pixar =

American computer animation studio

- Logo used since 1995

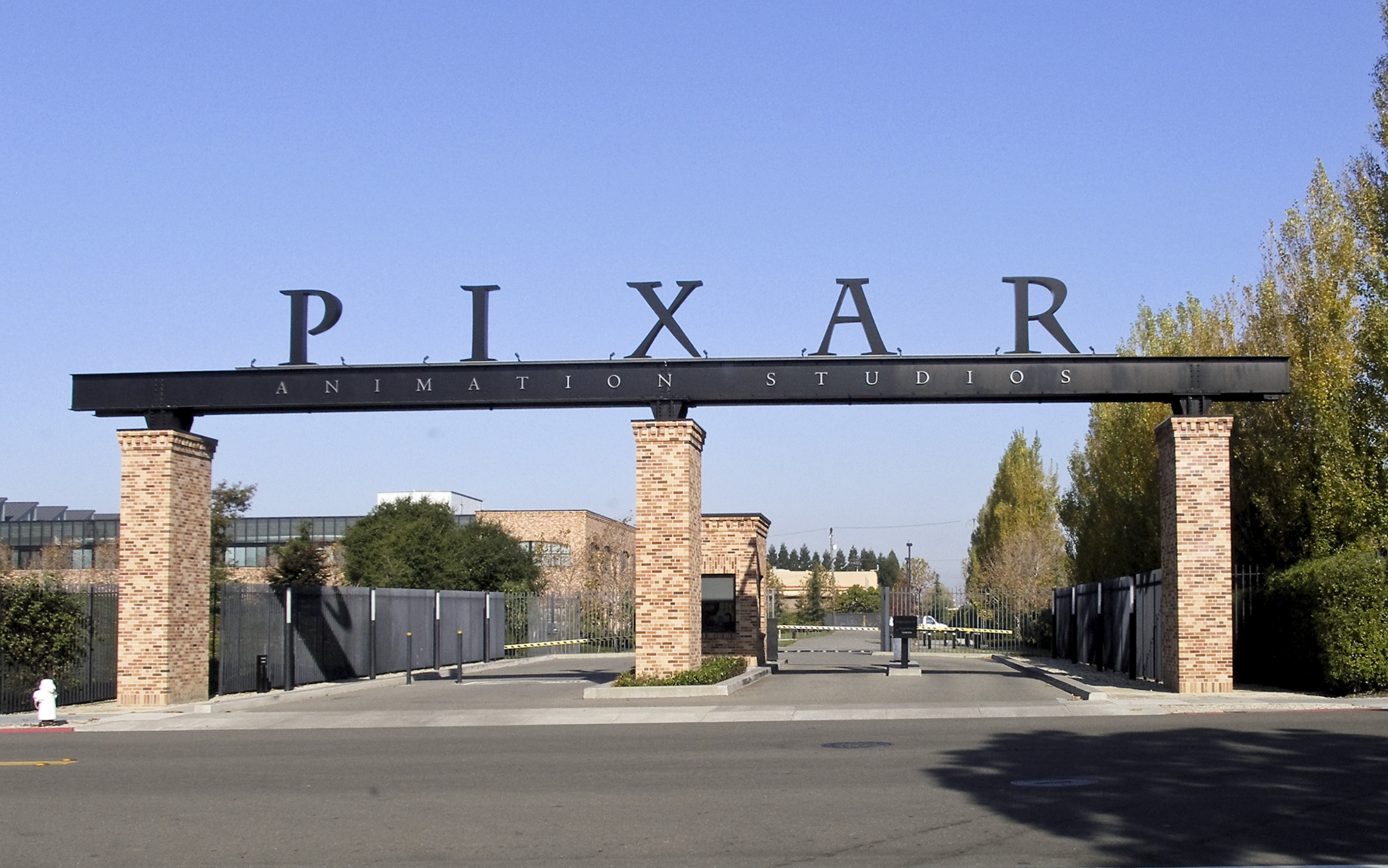
- Headquarters in Emeryville, California
- Trade name: Pixar Animation Studios
- Type: Subsidiary
- Traded as: Nasdaq: PIXR (1995–2006)
- Industry: Animation
- Predecessor: The Graphics Group of Lucasfilm Computer Division (1979–1986); Kadabrascope (1983)
- Founded: February 3, 1986; 40 years ago in Richmond, California
- Founders: Edwin Catmull; Alvy Ray Smith
- Headquarters: 1200 Park Avenue, Emeryville, California, U.S.
- Area served: Worldwide
- Key people: Jim Morris (CEO & president); Pete Docter (CCO)
- Products: Computer animations
- Brands: Pixar Image Computer; Pixar RenderMan
- Number of employees: 1,233 (2020)
- Parent: Walt Disney Studios (2006–present)
- Website: www.pixar.com

Pixar (Note: The legal name of the company is the single word Pixar, with no indicator of corporate status in its name. This is legal in California.) (/ˈpɪksɑːr/), doing business as Pixar Animation Studios, is an American animation studio based in Emeryville, California, known for its critically and commercially successful computer-animated feature films. Pixar is a subsidiary of Walt Disney Studios, a division of the Disney Entertainment segment of the Walt Disney Company. It is one of Disney's three feature animation studios, alongside Walt Disney Animation Studios and 20th Century Animation.

The studio started in 1979 as part of the Lucasfilm computer division. It was known as the Graphics Group before its spin-off as a corporation in 1986, with funding from Apple co-founder Steve Jobs, who became its majority shareholder. The studio's mascot is Luxo Jr., a desk lamp from the studio's 1986 short film of the same name. Disney announced its acquisition of Pixar in January 2006, and completed it in May 2006. Pixar is best known for its feature films, technologically powered by its RenderMan software. RenderMan began as Pixar's implementation of the industry-standard RenderMan Interface Specification (RISpec) image-rendering API, which came out in 1988; support for RISpec was dropped in 2016. RenderMan became fully path-traced and physically based (PBR).

In addition to producing short films, Pixar has produced 31 feature films, beginning with Toy Story (1995), which is also the first fully computer-animated feature film; its most recent film is Toy Story 5 (2026). As of July 2023, its feature films have earned over $17 billion at the worldwide box office with an average gross of $589 million per film. Toy Story 3 (2010), Finding Dory (2016), Incredibles 2 (2018), Toy Story 4 (2019), Inside Out 2 (2024) and Toy Story 5 (2026) all grossed over $1 billion and are among the 50 highest-grossing films of all time. Moreover, 13 of Pixar's films are in the 50 highest-grossing animated films of all time. As of 2026, Inside Out 2 is the third highest-grossing animated film of all time, previously being the first-highest before being surpassed by Ne Zha 2 and Zootopia 2 in 2025.

Pixar has earned 23 Academy Awards, 10 Golden Globe Awards, and 11 Grammy Awards, along with numerous other awards and acknowledgments. Eleven Pixar films have won the Academy Award for Best Animated Feature since the award's 2001 inauguration, including Finding Nemo (2003), The Incredibles (2004), Ratatouille (2007), WALL-E (2008), Up (2009), Toy Story 3 and Toy Story 4, Brave (2012), Inside Out (2015), Coco (2017), and Soul (2020). Toy Story 3 and Up were also nominated for the Academy Award for Best Picture.

In February 2009, Pixar executives John Lasseter, Brad Bird, Pete Docter, Andrew Stanton, and Lee Unkrich were presented with the Golden Lion for Lifetime Achievement by the Venice Film Festival. The physical award was ceremonially handed to Lucasfilm's founder, George Lucas.

== History ==
=== Early history ===
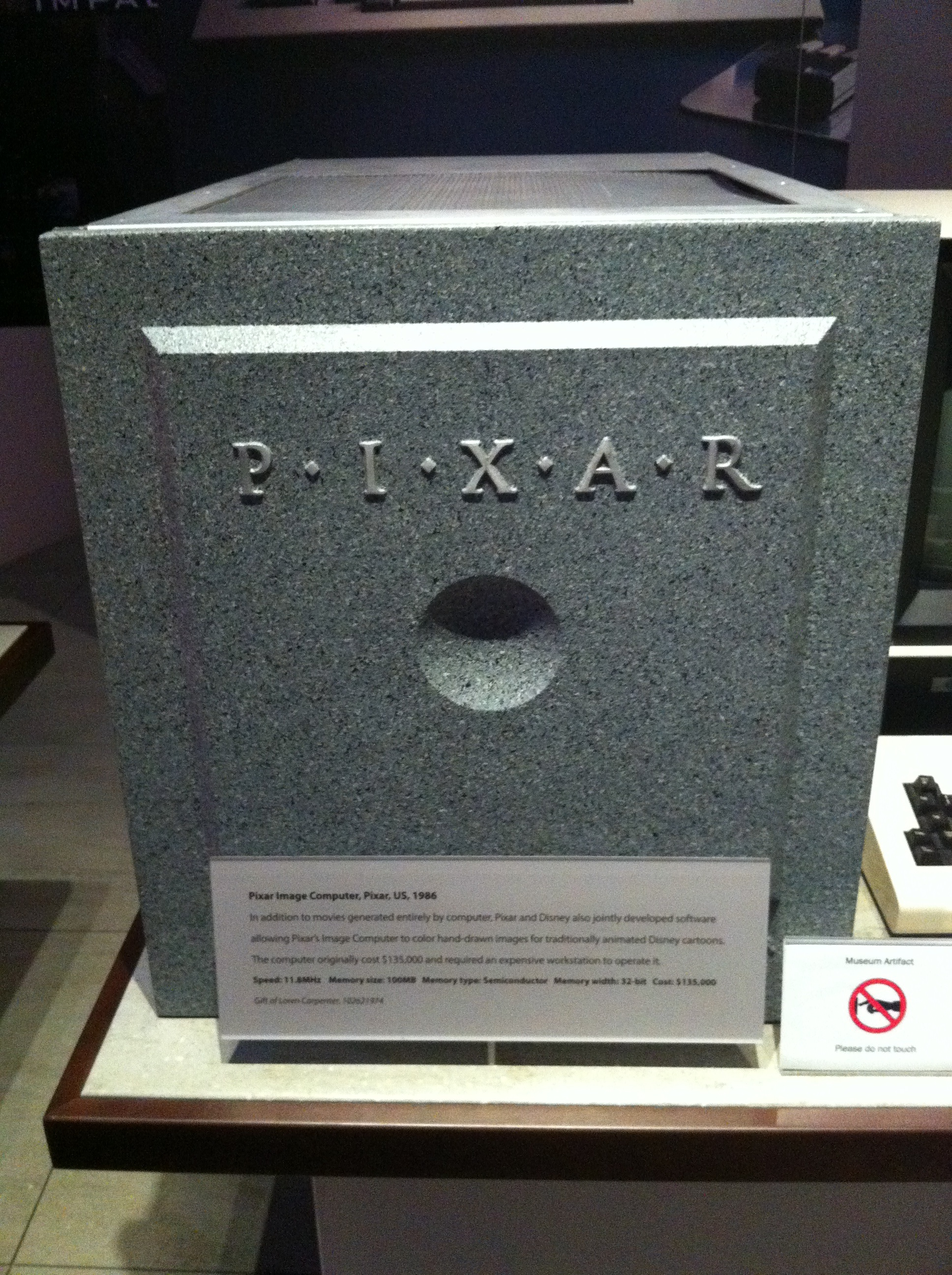
A Pixar computer at the Computer History Museum in Mountain View with the 1986–95 logo on it

Pixar got its start in 1974, when New York Institute of Technology's founder, Alexander Schure, who was also the owner of a traditional animation studio, established the Computer Graphics Lab (CGL) and recruited computer scientists who shared his ambitions about creating the world's first computer-animated film. Edwin Catmull and Malcolm Blanchard were the first to be hired and were soon joined by Alvy Ray Smith and David DiFrancesco some months later, who were the four original members of the Computer Graphics Lab, located in a converted two-story garage acquired from the former Vanderbilt-Whitney estate. Schure invested significant funds into the computer graphics lab, approximately $15 million, providing the resources the group needed but contributing to NYIT's financial difficulties. Eventually, the group realized they needed to work in a real film studio to reach their goal. Francis Ford Coppola then invited Smith to his house for a three-day media conference, where Coppola and George Lucas shared their visions for the future of digital moviemaking.

When Lucas approached the group and offered them jobs at his studio, six employees moved to Lucasfilm. During the following months, they gradually resigned from CGL, found temporary jobs for about a year to avoid making Schure suspicious, and joined the Graphics Group at Lucasfilm. The Graphics Group, which was one-third of the Computer Division of Lucasfilm, opened in 1979 with the hiring of Catmull from NYIT, where he was in charge of the Computer Graphics Lab. He was then reunited with Smith, who also made the journey from NYIT to Lucasfilm, and was made the director of the Graphics Group. At NYIT, the researchers pioneered many of the CG foundation techniques — in particular, the invention of the alpha channel by Catmull and Smith. Over the next several years, the CGL would produce a few frames of an experimental film called The Works. After moving to Lucasfilm, the team worked on creating the precursor to RenderMan, called REYES (for "renders everything you ever saw"), and developed several critical technologies for CG — including particle effects and various animation tools.

John Lasseter was hired to the Lucasfilm team for a week in late 1983 with the title "interface designer"; he animated the short film The Adventures of André & Wally B. In the next few years, a designer suggested naming a new digital compositing computer the "Picture Maker". Smith suggested that the laser-based device have a catchier name, and came up with "Pixer", which after a meeting was changed to "Pixar". According to Michael Rubin, the author of Droidmaker: George Lucas and the Digital Revolution, Smith and three other employees came up with the name during a restaurant visit in 1981, but when interviewing them he got four different versions about the origin of the name.

In 1982, the Pixar team began working on special-effects film sequences with Industrial Light & Magic. After years of research, and key milestones such as the Genesis Effect in Star Trek II: The Wrath of Khan and the Stained Glass Knight in Young Sherlock Holmes, the group, which then numbered 40 individuals, was spun out as a corporation in February 1986 by Catmull and Smith. Among the 38 remaining employees were Malcolm Blanchard, David DiFrancesco, Ralph Guggenheim, and Bill Reeves, who had been part of the team since the days of NYIT. Tom Duff, also an NYIT member, would later join Pixar after its formation. With Lucas's 1983 divorce, which coincided with the sudden dropoff in revenues from Star Wars licenses following the release of Return of the Jedi, they knew he would most likely sell the whole Graphics Group. Worried that the employees would be lost to them if that happened, which would prevent the creation of the first computer-animated movie, they concluded that the best way to keep the team together was to turn the group into an independent company. But Moore's Law also suggested that sufficient computing power for the first film was still some years away, and they needed to focus on a proper product until then. Eventually, they decided they should be a hardware company in the meantime, with their Pixar Image Computer as the core product, a system primarily sold to governmental, scientific, and medical markets. They also used SGI computers.

In 1983, Nolan Bushnell founded a new computer-guided animation studio called Kadabrascope as a subsidiary of his Chuck E. Cheese's Pizza Time Theatres company (PTT), which was founded in 1977. Only one major project was made out of the new studio, an animated Christmas special for NBC starring Chuck E. Cheese and other PTT mascots, known as Chuck E. Cheese: The Christmas That Almost Wasn't. The animation movement would be made using tweening instead of traditional cel animation. After the video game crash of 1983, Bushnell started selling some subsidiaries of PTT to keep the business afloat. Sente Technologies (another division, which was founded to have games distributed in PTT stores) was sold to Bally Games and Kadabrascope was sold to Lucasfilm. The Kadabrascope assets were combined with the Computer Division of Lucasfilm. Coincidentally, one of Steve Jobs's first jobs was under Bushnell in 1973 as a technician at his other company Atari, which Bushnell sold to Warner Communications in 1976 to focus on PTT. PTT would later go bankrupt in 1984 and be acquired by ShowBiz Pizza Place.

=== Independent company (1986–1999) ===
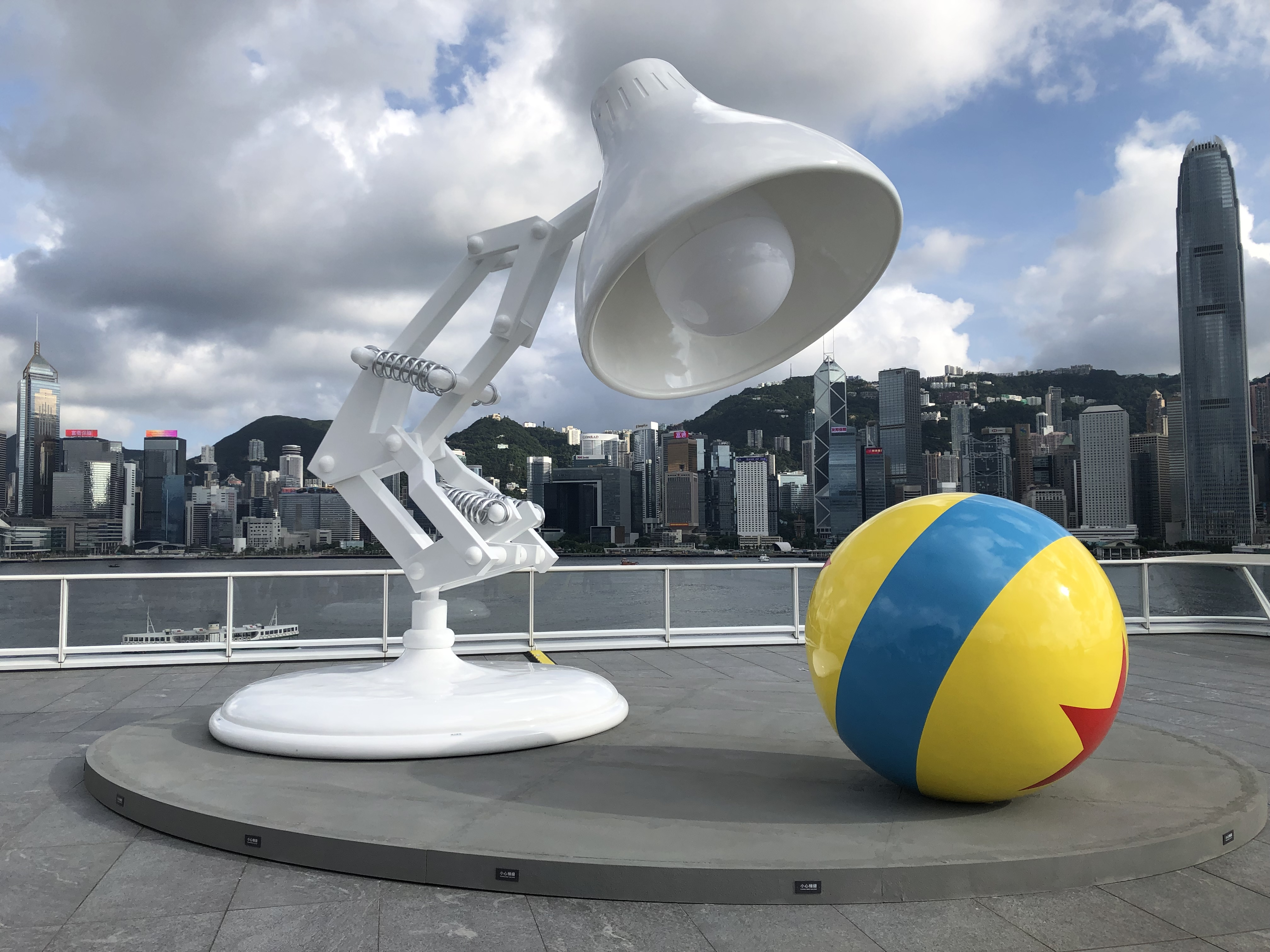
A Luxo Jr. figure display in Hong Kong

In 1986, the newly independent Pixar was headed by President Edwin Catmull and Executive Vice President Alvy Ray Smith. Lucas's search for investors led to an offer from Steve Jobs, which Lucas initially found too low. He eventually accepted after determining it impossible to find other investors. At that point, Smith and Catmull had been declined by 35 venture capitalists and ten large corporations, including a deal with General Motors which fell through three days before signing the contracts. Jobs, who had been edged out of Apple in 1985, was now founder and CEO of the new computer company NeXT. On February 3, 1986, he paid $5 million of his own money to George Lucas for technology rights and invested $5 million cash as capital into the company, joining the board of directors as chairman.

In 1985, while still at Lucasfilm, Pixar made a deal with the Japanese publisher Shogakukan to produce a computer-animated film titled Monkey, based on the Monkey King. The project continued sometime after they became a separate company in 1986, but it became clear that the technology was not sufficiently advanced. The computers were not powerful enough and the budget would be too high. As a result, they focused on the computer hardware business for years until a computer-animated feature became feasible according to Moore's law.

At the time, Walt Disney Studios made the decision to develop more efficient ways of producing animation. They reached out to Graphics Group at Lucasfilm and to Digital Productions. Because of the Graphics Group's deeper understanding of animation, and Smith's experience with paint programs at NYIT, it convinced Disney they were the right choice. In May 1986 Pixar signed a contract with Disney, who eventually bought and used the Pixar Image Computer and custom software written by Pixar as part of its Computer Animation Production System (CAPS) project, to migrate the laborious ink and paint part of the 2D animation process to a more automated method. The company's first feature film to be released using this new animation method was The Rescuers Down Under (1990).

In a bid to drive sales of the system and increase the company's capital, Jobs suggested releasing the product to the mainstream market. Pixar employee John Lasseter, who had long been working on not-for-profit short demonstration animations, such as Luxo Jr. (1986) to show off the device's capabilities, premiered his creations to great fanfare at SIGGRAPH, the computer graphics industry's largest convention.

However, the Image Computer had inadequate sales which threatened to end the company as financial losses grew. Jobs increased investment in exchange for an increased stake, reducing the proportion of management and employee ownership until eventually, his total investment of $50 million gave him control of the entire company. In 1989, Lasseter's growing animation department which was originally composed of just four people (Lasseter, Bill Reeves, Eben Ostby, and Sam Leffler), was turned into a division that produced computer-animated commercials for outside companies. In April 1990, Pixar sold its hardware division, including all proprietary hardware technology and imaging software, to Vicom Systems, and transferred 18 of Pixar's approximately 100 employees. In the same year Pixar moved from San Rafael to Richmond, California. Pixar released some of its software tools on the open market for Macintosh and Windows systems. RenderMan is one of the leading 3D packages of the early 1990s, and Typestry is a special-purpose 3D text renderer that competed with RayDream.

During this period of time, Pixar continued its successful relationship with Walt Disney Feature Animation, a studio whose corporate parent would ultimately become its most important partner. As 1991 began, however, the layoff of 30 employees in the company's computer hardware department (including the company's president, Chuck Kolstad), reduced the total number of employees to just 42, approximately its original number. On March 6, 1991, Steve Jobs bought the company from its employees and became the full owner. He contemplated folding it into NeXT, but the NeXT's co-founders refused. A few months later Pixar made a historic $26 million deal with Disney to produce three computer-animated feature films, the first of which was Toy Story (1995), the product of the technological limitations that challenged CGI. By then the software programmers working on RenderMan and IceMan, and Lasseter's animation department, which made television commercials (and four Luxo Jr. shorts for Sesame Street the same year), were all that remained of Pixar.

Despite the income from these projects, the company still continued to lose money, and Steve Jobs, as chairman of the board and now owner, often considered selling it. As late as 1994, Jobs contemplated selling Pixar to other companies such as Hallmark Cards, Microsoft co-founder Paul Allen, and Oracle CEO and co-founder Larry Ellison. After learning from New York critics that Toy Story would probably be a hit, and confirming that Disney would distribute it for the 1995 Christmas season, he decided to give Pixar another chance. Also for the first time, he took an active leadership role in the company and made himself CEO. Toy Story grossed nearly $362 million worldwide during its initial release. When Pixar held its initial public offering on November 29, 1995, trading as "PIXR" on NASDAQ, it exceeded Netscape's as the biggest IPO of the year. In its first half-hour of trading, Pixar stock shot from $28 to $45, delaying trading because of unmatched buy orders. Shares climbed to US$50 and closed the day at $42.

The company continued to make the television commercials during the production of Toy Story, which came to an end on July 9, 1996, when Pixar announced they would shut down its television commercial unit, which counted 18 employees, to focus on longer projects and interactive entertainment.

During the 1990s and 2000s, Pixar gradually developed the "Pixar Braintrust", the studio's primary creative development process, in which all of its directors, writers, and lead storyboard artists regularly examine each other's projects and give very candid "notes", the industry term for constructive criticism. The Braintrust operates under a philosophy of a "filmmaker-driven studio", in which creatives help each other move their films forward through a process somewhat like peer review, as opposed to the traditional Hollywood approach of an "executive-driven studio" in which directors are micromanaged through "mandatory notes" from development executives outranking the producers. According to Catmull, it evolved out of the working relationship between Lasseter, Andrew Stanton, Pete Docter, Lee Unkrich, and Joe Ranft on Toy Story.

As a result of the success of Toy Story, Pixar built a new studio at the Emeryville campus, which was designed by PWP Landscape Architecture and opened in November 2000.

=== Collaboration with Disney (1999–2006) ===
Pixar and Disney had disagreements over the production of Toy Story 2. Originally intended as a direct-to-video release (and thus not part of Pixar's three-picture deal), the film was eventually upgraded to a theatrical release during production. Pixar demanded that the film then be counted toward the three-picture agreement, but Disney refused. Though profitable for both, Pixar later complained that the arrangement was not equitable. Pixar was responsible for creation and production, while Disney handled marketing and distribution. Profits and production costs were split equally, but Disney exclusively owned all story, character, and sequel rights and also collected a 10–15% distribution fee.

The two companies attempted to reach a new agreement for ten months and failed on January 26, 2001, July 26, 2002, April 22, 2003, January 16, 2004, July 22, 2004, and January 14, 2005. The proposed distribution deal meant Pixar would control production and own the resulting story, character, and sequel rights, while Disney would own the right of first refusal to distribute any sequels. Pixar also wanted to finance its own films and collect 100% profit, paying Disney the 10–15% distribution fee. In addition, as part of any distribution agreement with Disney, Pixar demanded control over films already in production under the new agreement, including The Incredibles (2004) and Cars (2006). Disney considered these conditions unacceptable, but Pixar would not concede.

Disagreements between Steve Jobs and Disney chairman and CEO Michael Eisner caused the negotiations to cease in 2004, with Disney forming Circle Seven Animation and Jobs declaring that Pixar was actively seeking partners other than Disney. Despite this announcement and several talks with Warner Bros. Pictures, Sony Pictures, and 20th Century Fox, Pixar did not enter negotiations with other distributors, although a Warner Bros. spokesperson told CNN, "We would love to be in business with Pixar. They are a great company." After a lengthy hiatus, negotiations between the two companies resumed following the departure of Eisner from Disney in September 2005. In preparation for potential fallout between Pixar and Disney, Jobs announced in late 2004 that Pixar would no longer release movies at the Disney-dictated November time frame, but during the more lucrative early summer months. This would also allow Pixar to release DVDs for its major releases during the Christmas shopping season. An added benefit of delaying Cars from November 4, 2005, to June 9, 2006, was to extend the time frame remaining on the Pixar-Disney contract, to see how things would play out between the two companies.

Pending the Disney acquisition of Pixar, the two companies created a distribution deal for the intended 2007 release of Ratatouille, to ensure that if the acquisition failed or closing was delayed, the film would be released through Disney's distribution channels. In contrast to earlier Disney-Pixar films, Ratatouille's production costs were paid by Pixar, with Disney just responsible for distribution.

=== Walt Disney Studios subsidiary (2006–present) ===
After extended negotiations, Disney ultimately agreed on January 24, 2006, to buy Pixar for approximately $7.4 billion in an all-stock deal. Following Pixar shareholder approval, the acquisition was completed on May 5, 2006. The transaction catapulted Jobs, who owned 49.65% of total share interest in Pixar, to Disney's largest individual shareholder with 7%, valued at $3.9 billion, and a new seat on its board of directors. Jobs' new Disney holdings exceeded holdings belonging to Eisner, the previous top shareholder, who still held 1.7%; and Disney Director Emeritus Roy E. Disney, who held almost 1% of the corporation's shares. Pixar shareholders received 2.3 shares of Disney common stock for each share of Pixar common stock redeemed.

As part of the deal, John Lasseter, by then Executive Vice President, became Chief Creative Officer (reporting directly to president and CEO Bob Iger and consulting with Disney Director Roy E. Disney) of both Pixar and Walt Disney Animation Studios (including its division Disneytoon Studios), as well as the Principal Creative Adviser at Walt Disney Imagineering, which designs and builds the company's theme parks. Catmull retained his position as President of Pixar, while also becoming President of Walt Disney Animation Studios, reporting to Iger and Dick Cook, chairman of the Walt Disney Studios. Jobs's position as Pixar's chairman and chief executive officer was abolished, and instead, he took a place on the Disney board of directors.

After the deal closed in May 2006, Lasseter revealed that Iger had felt that Disney needed to buy Pixar while watching a parade at the opening of Hong Kong Disneyland in September 2005. Iger noticed that of all the Disney characters in the parade, none were characters that Disney had created within the last ten years since all the newer ones had been created by Pixar. Upon returning to Burbank, Iger commissioned a financial analysis that confirmed that Disney had actually lost money on animation for the past decade, then presented that information to the board of directors at his first board meeting after being promoted from COO to CEO, and the board, in turn, authorized him to explore the possibility of a deal with Pixar. Lasseter and Catmull were wary when the topic of Disney buying Pixar first came up, but Jobs asked them to give Iger a chance (based on his own experience negotiating with Iger in summer 2005 for the rights to ABC shows for the fifth-generation iPod Classic), and in turn, Iger convinced them of the sincerity of his feeling that Disney needed to re-focus on animation.

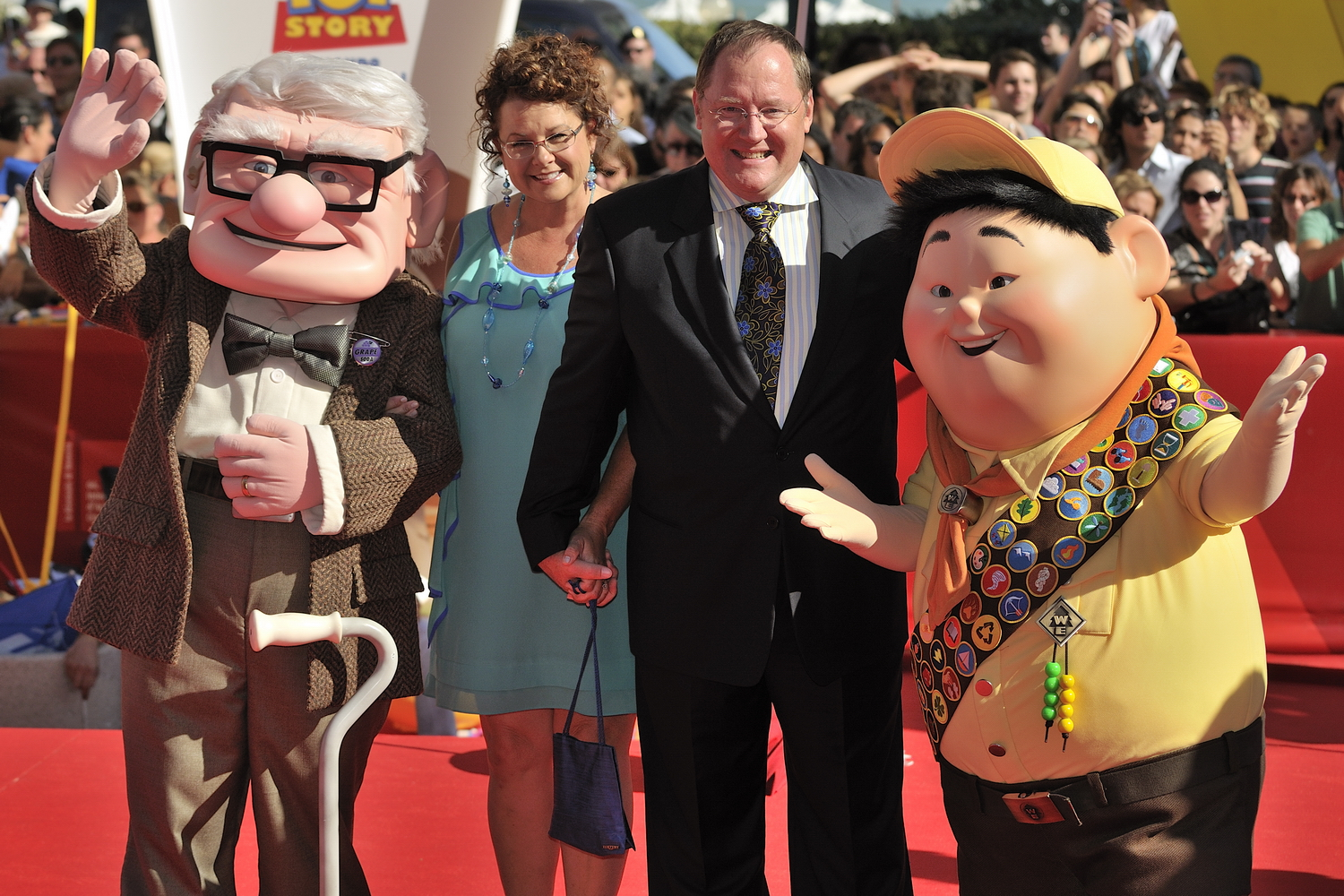
John Lasseter and his wife Nancy appear with characters from Up at the 2009 Venice Film Festival.

Lasseter and Catmull's oversight of both the Disney Feature Animation and Pixar studios did not mean that the two studios were merging, however. In fact, additional conditions were laid out as part of the deal to ensure that Pixar remained a separate entity, a concern that analysts had expressed about the Disney deal. Some of those conditions were that Pixar HR policies would remain intact, including the lack of employment contracts. Also, the Pixar name was guaranteed to continue, and the studio would remain in its current Emeryville, California, location with the "Pixar" sign. Finally, branding of films made post-merger would be "Disney•Pixar" (beginning with Cars).

Jim Morris, producer of WALL-E (2008), became general manager of Pixar. In this new position, Morris took charge of the day-to-day running of the studio facilities and products.

After a few years, Lasseter and Catmull were able to successfully transfer the basic principles of the Pixar Braintrust to Disney Animation, although meetings of the Disney Story Trust are reportedly "more polite" than those of the Pixar Braintrust. Catmull later explained that after the merger, to maintain the studios' separate identities and cultures (notwithstanding the fact of common ownership and common senior management), he and Lasseter "drew a hard line" that each studio was solely responsible for its own projects and would not be allowed to borrow personnel from or lend tasks out to the other. The rule ensures that each studio maintains "local ownership" of projects and can be proud of its own work. Thus for example, when Pixar had issues with Ratatouille and Disney Animation had issues with Bolt (2008), "nobody bailed them out" and each studio was required "to solve the problem on its own" despite knowing that there were personnel at the other studio who theoretically could have helped.

==== Expansion and John Lasseter's exit (2010–2018) ====
On April 20, 2010, Pixar opened Pixar Canada in the downtown area of Vancouver, British Columbia, Canada. The roughly 2,000-square-meter (22,000 sq ft) studio produced seven short films based on Toy Story and Cars characters. In October 2013, the studio was closed down to refocus Pixar's efforts at its main headquarters.

In November 2014, Morris was promoted to president of Pixar, while his counterpart at Disney Animation, general manager Andrew Millstein, was also promoted to president of that studio. Both continued to report to Catmull, who retained the title of president of both Disney Animation and Pixar.

On November 21, 2017, Lasseter announced that he was taking a six-month leave of absence after acknowledging what he called "missteps" in his behavior with employees in a memo to staff. According to The Hollywood Reporter and The Washington Post, Lasseter had a history of alleged sexual misconduct towards employees. On June 8, 2018, it was announced that Lasseter would leave Disney Animation and Pixar at the end of the year, but would take on a consulting role until then. Pete Docter was announced as Lasseter's replacement as chief creative officer of Pixar on June 19, 2018.

==== Sequels and financial success (2018–2019) ====
On June 15, 2018, Incredibles 2 was released, setting a record for widest opening weekend worldwide and domestic for an animated film. The film would eventually gross $1.2 billion worldwide. On October 23, 2018, it was announced that Catmull would be retiring. He stayed in an adviser role until July 2019. On January 18, 2019, it was announced that Lee Unkrich would be leaving Pixar after 25 years although he would return to the studio a few years later. On June 21, 2019, Toy Story 4 was released, surpassing the widest opening worldwide weekend record that Incredibles 2 set. The film would make over $1 billion and win the Academy Award for Best Animated Feature. During the 2019 D23 Expo, Pixar announced that their next film, Soul, would release in 2020. Ahead of the launch of Disney+, Pixar debuted SparkShorts, experimental shorts done by Pixar staff.

==== COVID-19 pandemic, Disney+ releases, and some financial struggles (2020–present) ====
Pixar released Onward on March 6, 2020. However, due to the start of the COVID-19 pandemic, the film underperformed at the box office and was released onto rental digital services on March 20, and later on Disney+ on April 3. Due to the pandemic, Soul was moved to November 2020, and ultimately released on December 25, 2020, on Disney+ at no additional cost to subscribers, and later became the first animated streaming film to win the Academy Award for Best Animated Feature. Pixar's next two features, Luca and Turning Red, were also released free on Disney+ in June 2021 and March 2022, respectively. In 2021, several Pixar employees anonymously criticized Disney's decision to release their films direct to Disney+.

Lightyear, Pixar's first movie to return to theaters, was released in June 2022. The film became a box-office failure with Deadline Hollywood calculating the film lost the studio $136 million, when factoring together all expenses and revenues. In September 2022, Jonas Rivera was promoted to Executive VP of Film Production at Pixar overseeing all film and streaming production. In December 2022, Disney CEO Bob Iger noted that they would rely more on the Pixar brand. In June 2023, Disney laid off 75 employees including the director of Lightyear Angus MacLane, and the film's producer Galyn Susman.

During that same month, Elemental was released. During the film's opening weekend, Docter stated that Pixar "trained audiences that these films will be available for you on Disney+". Despite opening below projections, Elemental ultimately made a box office comeback by early August 2023, crossing $430 million at the worldwide box office. Disney's EVP of Theatrical Distribution Tony Chambers stated "After a disappointing opening weekend, we're really pleased that audiences have discovered what a great movie it is." That same month, Morris said "at the box office we're looking at now, [the film] should do better than break even theatrically. And then we have revenue from streaming, theme parks and consumer products. This will certainly be a profitable film for the Disney company." In December 2023, it was announced that Soul, Turning Red and Luca would be released in theaters in the United States in the first quarter of 2024.

In January 2024, it was reported that Pixar's staff would face imminent layoffs by 20 percent, reducing the studio's workforce to less than 1,000 employees. However, the layoffs were then delayed and did not occur, reportedly because of production schedules. In May 2024, the studio proceeded with slightly smaller layoffs: 175 employees or approximately 14 percent of the studio's workforce of over 1,300 employees. The layoffs occurred as the studio began to rely less on direct-to-streaming series and more on feature films intended primarily for theatrical exhibition.

On June 14 of the same year, Inside Out 2 was released and became financially successful. The film had a domestic opening of $165 million, the third highest for an animated film, and the biggest global opening for an animated movie with $319 million. Since then, Inside Out 2 broke multiple box office records. It had the highest second weekend gross for an animated film with $100 million, being the first to reach the six-digit second opening weekend. It became the fastest animated movie to reach $1 billion at the global box office, reaching the milestone in 17 days. It also out-grossed Incredibles 2 to become the highest grossing Pixar film. Inside Out 2 became the highest-grossing animated film, and the 8th-highest-grossing film of all time at the end of its theatrical run. Dream Productions, an Inside Out spin off series set between the first and second film, was released on December 11, 2024, on Disney+.

In June 2025, Pixar released Elio. The film had the lowest box office opening for a Pixar film to date, earning $25 million, and an all-time low global opening of $39 million. In an op-ed, Rebecca Rubin for Variety noted that Elio faced stiff box office competition against the 2025 live-action remakes of How to Train Your Dragon and Disney's Lilo & Stitch. Shawn Robbins for Fandango observed, "Competition from family audiences was difficult to overcome. It makes you wonder how Elio would have performed in the spring, or even a week or two later." Rubin wrote that similar to Elemental, Elio could have steady box office longevity thanks to favorable reviews and positive word-of-mouth. However, Elio underperformed at the box office, earning $154 million worldwide. On September 17, 2025, Elio began streaming on Disney+ and became one of the top-streaming titles for that week.

In March 2026, Hoppers was released to positive reviews. During its opening weekend, it garnered $45.3 million in the United and Canada and $42 million overseas for a worldwide total of $88 million, taking first place at the box office. It was also the highest opening for an original Pixar film since Coco and the best opening for an original animated film.

In June 2026, Toy Story 5 earned nearly $160 million during its opening domestic box office weekend. Internationally, it earned $152 million for a global opening of $312 million, in which it became a record-high for the franchise and Pixar's history. A month later, Disney cut several hundred positions across its corporate divisions, including ESPN, Disney Entertainment Television and National Geographic, with Pixar reported to be the most impacted by the cuts. According to a WARN notice, 108 employees were affected. These reductions represent the broader corporate restructuring initiative under Disney CEO Josh D'Amaro.

== Campus ==
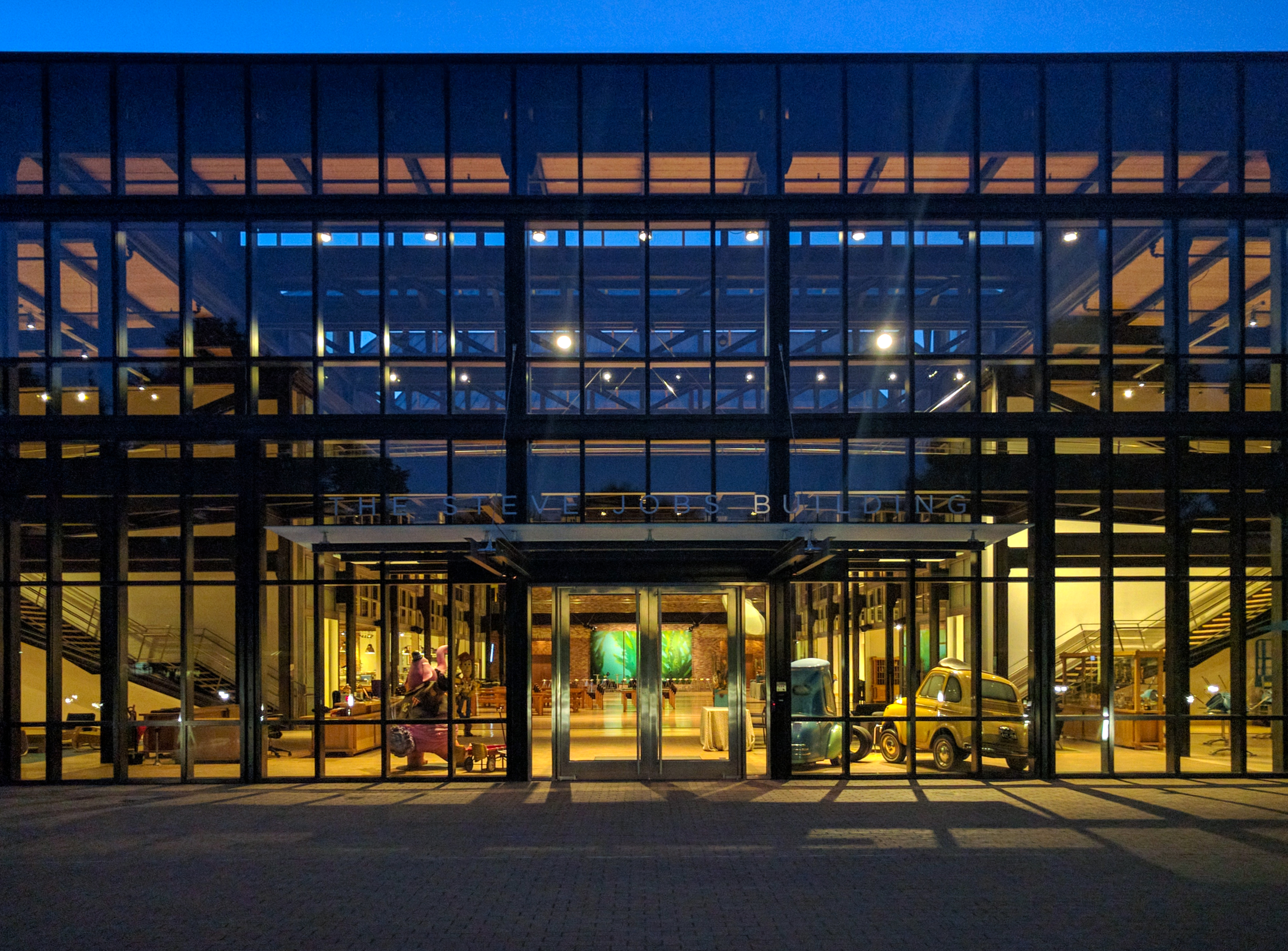
The Steve Jobs Building at the Pixar campus in Emeryville

When Steve Jobs, chief executive officer of Apple Inc. and Pixar, and John Lasseter, executive vice president of Pixar, decided to move their studios from a leased space in Point Richmond, California, to larger quarters of their own, they chose a 20-acre site in Emeryville, California, formerly occupied by Del Monte Foods, Inc. The first of several buildings, the high-tech structure designed by Bohlin Cywinski Jackson has special foundations and electricity generators to ensure continued film production, even through major earthquakes. The character of the building is intended to abstractly recall Emeryville's industrial past. The two-story steel-and-masonry building is a collaborative space with many pathways.

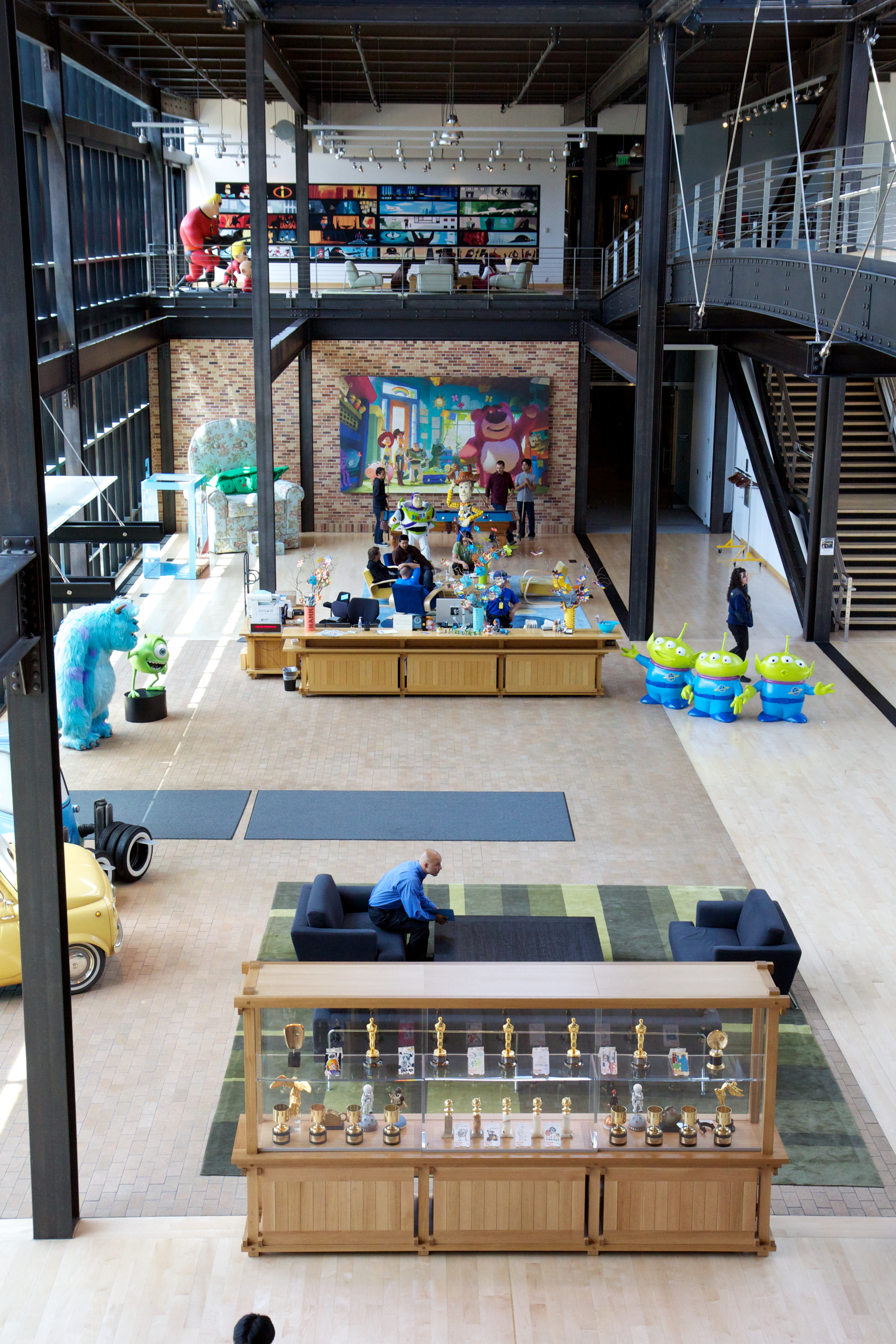
A view of the atrium at the Pixar campus in 2010

The digital revolution in filmmaking was driven by applied mathematics, including computational physics and geometry. In 2008, this led Pixar senior scientist Tony DeRose to offer to host the second Julia Robinson Mathematics Festival at the Emeryville campus.

== Filmography ==
Release timeline
| 1995 | Toy Story |
1996
1997
| 1998 | A Bug's Life |
| 1999 | Toy Story 2 |
2000
| 2001 | Monsters, Inc. |
2002
| 2003 | Finding Nemo |
| 2004 | The Incredibles |
2005
| 2006 | Cars |
| 2007 | Ratatouille |
| 2008 | WALL-E |
| 2009 | Up |
| 2010 | Toy Story 3 |
| 2011 | Cars 2 |
| 2012 | Brave |
| 2013 | Monsters University |
2014
| 2015 | Inside Out |
| 2015 | The Good Dinosaur |
| 2016 | Finding Dory |
| 2017 | Cars 3 |
| 2017 | Coco |
| 2018 | Incredibles 2 |
| 2019 | Toy Story 4 |
| 2020 | Onward |
| 2020 | Soul |
| 2021 | Luca |
| 2022 | Turning Red |
| 2022 | Lightyear |
| 2023 | Elemental |
| 2024 | Inside Out 2 |
| 2025 | Elio |
| 2026 | Hoppers |
| 2026 | Toy Story 5 |
| 2027 | Gatto |
| 2028 | Ghost Market |
| 2028 | Incredibles 3 |
| 2029 | Coco 2 |
| TBA | Untitled third Monsters, Inc. film |

=== Traditions ===
Some of Pixar's first animators were former cel animators including John Lasseter, and others came from computer animation or were fresh college graduates. A large number of animators that make up its animation department had been hired around the releases of A Bug's Life (1998), Monsters, Inc. (2001), and Finding Nemo (2003). The success of Toy Story (1995) made Pixar the first major computer-animation studio to successfully produce theatrical feature films. The majority of the animation industry was (and still is) located in Los Angeles, and Pixar is located 350 miles (560 km) north in the San Francisco Bay Area. Traditional hand-drawn animation was still the dominant medium for feature animated films.

With the scarcity of Los Angeles-based animators willing to move their families so far north to give up traditional animation and try computer animation, Pixar's new hires at this time either came directly from college or had worked outside feature animation. For traditional animators, the Pixar animation software Marionette was designed to require minimal training before becoming productive.

In a 2007 interview with PBS talk show host Tavis Smiley, Lasseter said that Pixar's films follow the same theme of self-improvement as the company itself has: with the help of friends or family, a character ventures out into the real world and learns to appreciate his friends and family. At the core, Lasseter said, "it's gotta be about the growth of the main character and how he changes."

Actor John Ratzenberger has voiced a character in every Pixar feature film from Toy Story through Onward (2020). In addition, a non-speaking background character in Soul (2020) bears his likeness.

Due to the traditions that have occurred within the films and shorts such as anthropomorphic creatures and objects, and easter egg crossovers between films and shorts that have been spotted by Pixar fans, a blog post titled The Pixar Theory was published in 2013 by Jon Negroni, and popularized by the YouTube channel Super Carlin Brothers, proposing that all of the characters within the Pixar universe were related, surrounding Boo from Monsters Inc. and the Witch from Brave (2012).

Additionally, Pixar is known for their films having expensive budgets, ranging from $150–250 million. Some of these films include Ratatouille (2007), Toy Story 3 (2010), Toy Story 4 (2019), Toy Story 5 (2026), Incredibles 2 (2018), Inside Out (2015), Inside Out 2 (2024), The Good Dinosaur (2015), Onward, Soul (both 2020), Turning Red, Lightyear (both 2022), Elemental (2023), and Elio (2025). In a 2023 interview, Pixar's president Jim Morris stated that one of the reasons why their films have expensive budgets is because they are produced entirely in the U.S. with all of the artists under one roof, while almost all of their competitors keep costs down by doing work offshore.

=== Sequels and prequels ===
As of March 2025, seven Pixar films have received or will receive sequels or prequels. These films are Toy Story, Cars, Monsters, Inc., Finding Nemo, The Incredibles, Inside Out, and Coco.

Toy Story 2 was originally commissioned by Disney as a 60-minute direct-to-video film. Expressing doubts about the strength of the material, John Lasseter convinced the Pixar team to start from scratch and make the sequel their third full-length feature film.

Following the release of Toy Story 2 in 1999, Pixar and Disney had a gentlemen's agreement that Disney would not make any sequels without Pixar's involvement though retaining a right to do so. After the two companies were unable to agree on a new deal, Disney announced in 2004 they would plan to move forward on sequels with or without Pixar and put Toy Story 3 into pre-production at Disney's then-new CGI division Circle Seven Animation. However, when Lasseter was placed in charge of all Disney and Pixar animation following Disney's acquisition of Pixar in 2006, he put all sequels on hold and Toy Story 3 was canceled. In May 2006, it was announced that Toy Story 3 was back in pre-production with a new plot and under Pixar's control. The film was released on June 18, 2010, as Pixar's eleventh feature film.

Shortly after announcing the resurrection of Toy Story 3, Lasseter stated, "If we have a great story, we'll do a sequel." Cars 2, Pixar's first non-Toy Story sequel, was officially announced in April 2008 and released on June 24, 2011, as their twelfth. Monsters University, a prequel to Monsters, Inc. (2001), was announced in April 2010 and initially set for release in November 2012; the release date was pushed to June 21, 2013, due to Pixar's past success with summer releases, according to a Disney executive.

In June 2011, Tom Hanks, who voiced Woody in the Toy Story series, implied that Toy Story 4 was "in the works", although it had not yet been confirmed by the studio. In April 2013, Finding Dory, a sequel to Finding Nemo, was announced for a June 17, 2016, release. In March 2014, Incredibles 2 and Cars 3 were announced as films in development. In November 2014, Toy Story 4 was confirmed to be in development with Lasseter serving as director. However, in July 2017, Lasseter announced that he had stepped down, leaving Josh Cooley as sole director. Released in June 2019, Toy Story 4 ranks among the 40 top-grossing films in American cinema.

On July 3, 2016, Pixar president Jim Morris announced that the studio might be moving away from sequels after Toy Story 4. This was affirmed by producer Mark Nielsen in May 2019. Shortly after its release, Pixar's chief creative officer Pete Docter confirmed that the studio would take a break from sequels and focus on original projects. However, in a later interview, Docter said the studio would have to return to making sequels at some point for its "financial safety". In September 2022, during the D23 Expo, Docter and Amy Poehler (voice of Joy in Inside Out) confirmed that Inside Out 2 was in development, with the film being released on June 14, 2024. In February 2023, Disney CEO Bob Iger announced that Toy Story 5 was in development, with the film being released on June 19, 2026.

In August 2024, during the D23 Expo, Docter announced that Incredibles 3 is in development, with Brad Bird returning to develop. That same month, on the subject of making a sequel, Docter stated "I want to make it because we have something new to say with these characters. And there's been a number of films that we would love to have a sequel to, that we couldn't find something." Incredibles 3 is scheduled to be released on June 16, 2028.

At the Disney Shareholder Meeting in March 2025, Bob Iger announced that Coco 2 was in development. Lee Unkrich and Adrian Molina are returning as director and co-director respectively while Mark Nielsen is producing. The film is scheduled to be released on November 21, 2029.

=== Adaptation to television ===
Toy Story is the first Pixar film to be adapted for television as a Buzz Lightyear of Star Command film and TV series on the UPN television network, now The CW. Cars became the second with the help of Cars Toons, a series of 3-to-5-minute short films running between regular Disney Channel show intervals and featuring Mater from Cars. Between 2013 and 2014, Pixar released its first two television specials, Toy Story of Terror! and Toy Story That Time Forgot. Monsters at Work, a television series spin-off of Monsters, Inc. produced by Disney Television Animation, premiered in July 2021 on Disney+.

On December 10, 2020, it was announced that three series would be released on Disney+. The first Dug Days (featuring Dug from Up (2009)), which premiered on September 1, 2021. The second, a Cars show titled Cars on the Road, which follows Mater and Lightning McQueen as they go on a road trip. It premiered on Disney+ on September 8, 2022. An original show entitled Win or Lose, which follows a middle school softball team the week leading up to the big championship game where each episode is from a different perspective, premiered on Disney+ on February 19, 2025.

A TV series based on Inside Out was announced to be in development for Disney+ in June 2023, with Soul co-writer Mike Jones hired as developer. The series, titled Dream Productions, premiered on Disney+ on December 11, 2024.

On August 8, 2025, it was announced that a series is being developed as the third series in the Cars franchise, titled Cars: Lightning Racers. It is set to be released on Disney Jr. in 2027.

=== 2D animation and live-action ===
The Pixar filmography to date has been computer-animated features. So far, WALL-E (2008) has been the only Pixar film not to be completely animated as it features a small amount of live-action, including footage from the 1969 film Hello, Dolly! while the short films Your Friend the Rat (2007), Day & Night (2010), Kitbull (2019), Burrow (2020), and Twenty Something (2021) feature 2D animation. 1906, the live-action film by Brad Bird based on a screenplay and novel by James Dalessandro about the 1906 earthquake, was in development but has since been abandoned by Bird and Pixar. Bird has stated that he was "interested in moving into the live-action realm with some projects" while "staying at Pixar [because] it's a very comfortable environment for me to work in". In June 2018, Bird mentioned the possibility of adapting the novel as a TV series, and the earthquake sequence as a live-action feature film.

The Toy Story Toons short Hawaiian Vacation (2011) also includes the fish and shark as live-action.

Jim Morris, president of Pixar, produced Disney's John Carter (2012) which Pixar filmmaker Andrew Stanton co-wrote and directed.

Pixar's creative heads were consulted to fine tune the script for the 2011 live-action film The Muppets. Similarly, Pixar assisted in the story development of Disney's The Jungle Book (2016) as well as providing suggestions for the film's end credits sequence. Both Pixar and Mark Andrews were given a "Special Thanks" credit in the film's credits. Additionally, many Pixar animators, both former and current, were recruited for a traditional hand-drawn animated sequence for the 2018 film Mary Poppins Returns.

Pixar representatives have also assisted in the English localization of several Studio Ghibli films, mainly those by Hayao Miyazaki.

In 2019, Pixar developed a live-action hidden camera reality show, titled Pixar in Real Life, for Disney+.

=== Franchises ===
| Titles | Films | Short films | TV seasons | Release date |
|---|---|---|---|---|
| Toy Story | 7 | 7 | 2 | 1995–present |
| Monsters, Inc. | 3 | 2 | 2 | 2001–present |
| Finding Nemo | 2 | 5 | 0 | 2003–present |
| The Incredibles | 3 | 6 | 0 | 2004–present |
| Cars | 3 | 5 | 3 | 2006–present |
| Inside Out | 2 | 1 | 1 | 2015–present |
| Coco | 2 | 3 | 0 | 2017–present |

=== Highest-grossing films ===
Highest-grossing films in North America
| Rank | Title | Year | Gross |
|---|---|---|---|
| 1 | Inside Out 2 | 2024 | $653,980,194 |
| 2 | Incredibles 2 | 2018 | $608,581,744 |
| 3 | Finding Dory | 2016 | $486,295,561 |
| 4 | Toy Story 5 | 2026 | $480,294,461 |
| 5 | Toy Story 4 | 2019 | $434,038,008 |
| 6 | Toy Story 3 | 2010 | $415,004,880 |
| 7 | Finding Nemo^{‡} | 2003 | $380,843,261 |
| 8 | Inside Out | 2015 | $356,921,711 |
| 9 | Up | 2009 | $293,004,164 |
| 10 | Monsters University | 2013 | $268,492,764 |
| 11 | The Incredibles | 2004 | $261,441,092 |
| 12 | Monsters, Inc.^{‡} | 2001 | $255,873,250 |
| 13 | Toy Story 2^{‡} | 1999 | $245,852,179 |
| 14 | Cars | 2006 | $244,082,982 |
| 15 | Brave | 2012 | $237,283,207 |
| 16 | Toy Story^{‡} | 1995 | $229,947,062 |
| 17 | WALL-E | 2008 | $223,808,164 |
| 18 | Coco | 2017 | $210,460,015 |
| 19 | Ratatouille | 2007 | $206,445,654 |
| 20 | Cars 2 | 2011 | $191,452,396 |
| 21 | Hoppers | 2026 | $166,010,783 |
| 22 | A Bug's Life | 1998 | $162,798,565 |
| 23 | Elemental | 2023 | $154,426,697 |
| 24 | Cars 3 | 2017 | $152,901,115 |
| 25 | The Good Dinosaur | 2015 | $123,087,120 |

Highest-grossing films worldwide
| Rank | Title | Year | Gross |
|---|---|---|---|
| 1 | Inside Out 2 | 2024 | $1,699,863,816 |
| 2 | Incredibles 2 | 2018 | $1,243,225,667 |
| 3 | Toy Story 5 | 2026 | $1,148,032,461 |
| 4 | Toy Story 4 | 2019 | $1,073,394,593 |
| 5 | Toy Story 3 | 2010 | $1,066,969,703 |
| 6 | Finding Dory | 2016 | $1,028,570,889 |
| 7 | Finding Nemo^{‡} | 2003 | $940,637,960 |
| 8 | Inside Out | 2015 | $857,611,174 |
| 9 | Coco | 2017 | $807,816,196 |
| 10 | Monsters University | 2013 | $743,559,607 |
| 11 | Up | 2009 | $735,099,082 |
| 12 | The Incredibles | 2004 | $631,688,498 |
| 13 | Ratatouille | 2007 | $623,726,085 |
| 14 | Monsters, Inc.^{‡} | 2001 | $579,773,250 |
| 15 | Cars 2 | 2011 | $559,852,396 |
| 16 | Brave | 2012 | $538,983,207 |
| 17 | WALL-E | 2008 | $521,311,860 |
| 18 | Toy Story 2^{‡} | 1999 | $511,358,276 |
| 19 | Elemental | 2023 | $496,444,308 |
| 20 | Cars | 2006 | $461,983,149 |
| 21 | Toy Story^{‡} | 1995 | $401,157,969 |
| 22 | Hoppers | 2026 | $389,487,827 |
| 23 | Cars 3 | 2017 | $383,930,656 |
| 24 | A Bug's Life | 1998 | $363,258,859 |
| 25 | The Good Dinosaur | 2015 | $332,207,671 |

^{‡}—Includes theatrical reissue(s).

== Co-op Program ==
The Pixar Co-op Program, a part of the Pixar University professional development program, allows Pixar employees to use Pixar resources to produce independent films. The first 3D project accepted to the program was Borrowed Time (2016); all previously accepted films were live-action.

== See also ==
- 12 basic principles of animation
- 20th Century Animation
- Animation studios owned by the Walt Disney Company
- Blue Sky Studios
- Circle Seven Animation
- Disney Animation: The Illusion of Life
- Disney's Nine Old Men
- Disneytoon Studios
- List of animation studios
- List of Disney theatrical animated feature films
- Modern animation in the United States: Disney
- Walt Disney Animation Studios
- The Walt Disney Company

== Bibliography ==
- Isaacson, Walter (2011). Steve Jobs (1st ed.). New York: Simon & Schuster. ISBN 978-1-4516-4853-9. At the Internet Archive.
- Price, David A. (2008). The Pixar Touch: The Making of a Company (1st ed.). New York: Alfred A. Knopf. ISBN 978-0-307-26575-3.
