= David DiFrancesco =

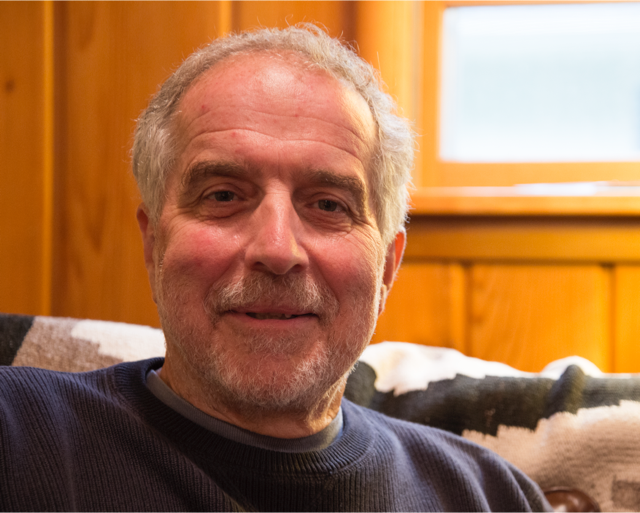

David DiFrancesco (born Nutley, New Jersey, 1949) is a photoscientist, inventor, cinematographer, and photographer. He is a founding member of three organizations which pioneered computer graphics for digital special effects and film with Edwin Catmull and Alvy Ray Smith, including; New York Institute of Technology Computer Graphics Lab, Lucasfilm Computer Division, and Pixar, financed by Steve Jobs.

== Life and career ==
Raised in Nutley, New Jersey, DiFrancesco graduated from Nutley High School in 1967.

As director of the Pixar Photoscience Team at Pixar, DiFrancesco and his team were responsible for the task of accurately transferring high resolution digital images to film. In this role, he developed the world's first laser scanning and recording devices for 35mm motion picture film and established reliable, commercially successful methods for this process, called PixarVision. This pioneering work earned him two Scientific and Engineering Technical Academy Awards and 16 patents. In 1996 the Society of Motion Picture and Television Engineers adopted his recommended practices for governing output of digital images to film.

Before that DiFrancesco worked at Computer Image Corp., working on Scanimate with Lee Harrison, and also at Xerox PARC with Dick Shoup working on the first 8-bit shift register framebuffer technology, and at JPL with Jim Blinn working on Carl Sagan's Cosmos Series. His prototype film recorder resides in the permanent apparatus collection of the George Eastman House International Museum of Photography and Film. His recent research included the development of a prototype interchangeable light field lens for motion picture cameras that enables post-production re-focusing of motion picture images and the capturing of 3D motion pictures with a single lens and camera.

In 2004, DiFrancesco designed a custom LED-based stroboscopic lighting system to sync the animation of physical Pixar Toy Story characters in the Pixar Zoetrope, first shown at the Museum of Modern Art in collaboration with [Pixar's 20th Anniversary exhibit]. The original Pixar Zoetrope has travelled the world to various museums and several other zoetropes are on display at Disneyland's California Adventure theme park in Southern California and other Disney theme parks.

DiFrancesco's technical knowledge with zoetropes was put into use on a two-minute film entitled “Forza/Filmspeed,” directed by Jeff Zwart. The film revealed the world's fastest Zoetrope in the form of a high resolution still images taken from the Xbox game Forza Motorsport 5. Stills from the game were printed onto panels and staged at key intervals around a Barber Motorsports Park race track to recreate the illusion of movement known as the persistence of vision. On November 19, 2017, he was inducted into the Nutley Hall of Fame.

As a photographer, DiFrancesco's work has been displayed at the MoMa in New York City, the Yale University Library collection, V&A CG collection London, England and in a number of private collections. He holds a BFA from the University of Wisconsin-Superior, attended the Danish Film Institute and the MFA program at the University of Colorado. In 2000, he was awarded an honorary PhD from the University of Wisconsin-Superior.

== Motorsports ==
DiFrancesco's early career in motorsports included road rallies, Ice Racing and Gymkhana's driving Porsches during the 1960s. In addition, DiFrancesco is a collector and restorer of vintage race cars and motorcycles including a 1953 Siata 208s, shown at the Concorso Italiano in 2007, a 1938 Brough Superior raced in CSRG vintage in the 1980s, an SCCA NW regional winning DP 1956 AC Bristol, and a brace of Yamaha factory road racers. He has contributed to the creation of the Pixar Motorama, in what started as an employee-owned event that eventually inspired the creation of the film “Cars” and grew to an internationally recognized private car show at the Pixar headquarters in Emeryville, California.

== Filmography ==
- Young Sherlock Holmes, (1985) Paramount
- Back to the Future Part II, (1989) Amblin/Universal
- The Hunt for Red October, (1990) Paramount
- Back to the Future Part III, (1990) Amblin/Universal
- Ghost, (1990) Paramount
- Toy Story, (1995) Disney/Pixar
- A Bug's Life, (1998) Disney/Pixar
- Toy Story 2, (1999) Disney/Pixar
- Monsters, Inc., (2001) Disney/Pixar
- Finding Nemo, (2003) Disney/Pixar
- The Incredibles, (2004) Disney/Pixar
- Cars, (2006) Disney/Pixar
- Ratatouille, (2007) Disney/Pixar
- WALL-E, (2008) Disney/Pixar
- Up, (2009) Disney/Pixar
- Brave, (2012) Disney/Pixar
