= Ralph Guggenheim =

American video graphics designer and film producer

Ralph Guggenheim is an American video graphics designer and film producer. He won a Producers Guild of America Award in 1995 for his contributions to the film Toy Story.

== Biography ==
He was born in New Rochelle, New York to Hanneleis Feibelmann, a German-Jewish Holocaust survivor, and Jules Guggenheim, a Swiss-born businessman. Guggenheim studied at New Rochelle High School and earned admission to Carnegie Mellon University.

At Carnegie Mellon University, Guggenheim became one of the first students in Dietrich college to self-define a major in film, and went on to create a documentary about the Robotics Institute in the School of Computer Science. Creating the documentary exposed him to the 3D research at the time and fostered his interest in continuing on in his Masters at CMU in the School of Computer Science. Guggenheim stayed in Pittsburgh and graduated in 1977 with a Masters in Computer Science.

After his time at CMU, Ralph worked for the New York Institute of Technology Computer Graphics Lab.

In 1980, he was contracted by Lucasfilm and moved to California. During his time at Lucasfilm, Guggenheim developed EditDroid, which proved to be a revolutionary film-editing system. In 1985, he transferred to the graphic and animation division of Lucasfilm. It was sold to Steve Jobs in 1986 and renamed Pixar, Guggenheim continued to work in the world of graphics and animation. Guggenheim, a respected founder of Pixar, eventually became Vice President of Feature Animation and co-produced Toy Story alongside Bonnie Arnold. He said about the movie "It took 20 years to write software that was friendly enough for artists and animators to make use of it".

Guggenheim left the company in 1997 after Disney forced Pixar to remove him as producer from Toy Story 2.

Since his time at Pixar, Guggenheim has worked as an executive at Electronic Arts (project Majestic). After his time at Electronic Arts, Guggenheim started Alligator Planet LLC with three other partners. Guggenheim is currently the CEO of Alligator Planet.
