= Isoline (disambiguation) =

Isoline is a curve joining points of equal value.

It may also refer to:

- Isoline (opera), an 1888 opera by André Messager

== See also ==
- Isoline retrieval, a remote sensing inverse method
- Isobar (disambiguation)
- Isotherm (disambiguation)
