= Atmospheric sounding =

Measurement of vertical distribution of physical properties of the atmospheric column

Atmospheric sounding or atmospheric profiling is a measurement of vertical distribution of physical properties of the atmospheric column such as pressure, temperature, wind speed and wind direction (thus deriving wind shear), liquid water content, ozone concentration, pollution, and other properties. Such measurements are performed in a variety of ways including remote sensing and in situ observations.

The most common in situ sounding is a radiosonde, which usually is a weather balloon, but can also be a rocketsonde.

Remote sensing soundings generally use passive infrared and microwave radiometers:

- airborne instruments
- surface stations
- Earth-observing satellite instruments such as AIRS and AMSU
- observation of atmospheres on different planets, such as the Mars climate sounder on the Mars Reconnaissance Orbiter

== Direct methods ==
Sensors that measure atmospheric constituents directly, such as thermometers, barometers, and humidity sensors, can be sent aloft on balloons, rockets or dropsondes. They can also be carried on the outer hulls of ships and aircraft or even mounted on towers. In this case, all that is needed to capture the measurements are storage devices and/or transponders.

== Indirect methods ==
The more challenging case involves sensors, primarily satellite-mounted, such as radiometers, optical sensors, radar, lidar and ceilometer as well as sodar since these cannot measure the quantity of interest, such as temperature, pressure, humidity etc., directly. By understanding emission and absorption processes, we can figure out what the instrument is looking at between the layers of atmosphere. While this type of instrument can also be operated from ground stations or vehicles—optical methods can also be used inside in situ instruments—satellite instruments are particularly important because of their extensive, regular coverage. The AMSU instruments on three NOAA and two EUMETSAT satellites, for instance, can sample the entire globe at better than one degree resolution in less than a day.

We can distinguish between two broad classes of sensor: active, such as radar, that have their own source, and passive that only detect what is already there. There can be a variety of sources for a passive instrument, including scattered radiation, light emitted directly from the sun, moon or stars—both more appropriate in the visual or ultra-violet range—as well light emitted from warm objects, which is more appropriate in the microwave and infrared.

=== Viewing geometry ===
A limb sounder looks at the edge of the atmosphere where it is visible above the Earth. It does this in one of two ways: either it tracks the sun, moon, a star, or another transmitting satellite through the limb as the source gets occultated behind the Earth, or it looks towards empty space, collecting radiation that is scattered from one of these sources. In contrast, a nadir sounder looks down (at nadir) through the atmosphere at the surface. The SCIAMACHY instrument operates in all three of these modes. A zenith sounder looks up (at zenith) from a ground-based location.

== Atmospheric inverse problem ==
=== Statement of the problem ===
The following applies mainly to passive sensors, but has some applicability to active sensors.

Typically, there is a vector of values of the quantity to be retrieved, $\vec x$, called the state vector and a vector of measurements, $\vec y$. The state vector could be temperatures, ozone number densities, humidities etc. The measurement vector is typically counts, radiances or brightness temperatures from a radiometer or similar detector but could include any other quantity germane to the problem. The forward model maps the state vector to the measurement vector:

$$\vec y = \vec f (\vec x)$$

Usually the mapping, $\vec f$, is known from physical first principles, but this may not always be the case. Instead, it may only be known empirically, by matching actual measurements with actual states. Satellite and many other remote sensing instruments do not measure the relevant physical properties, that is the state, but rather the amount of radiation emitted in a particular direction, at a particular frequency. It is usually easy to go from the state space to the measurement space—for instance with Beer's law or radiative transfer—but not the other way around, therefore we need some method of inverting $\vec f$ or of finding the inverse model, $\vec f^{-1}$.

=== Methods of solution ===
If the problem is linear we can use some type of matrix inverse method—often the problem is ill-posed or unstable so we will need to regularize it: good, simple methods include the normal equation or singular value decomposition. If the problem is weakly nonlinear, an iterative method such Newton–Raphson may be appropriate.

Sometimes the physics is too complicated to model accurately or the forward model too slow to be used effectively in the inverse method. In this case, statistical or machine learning methods such as linear regression, neural networks, statistical classification, kernel estimation, etc. can be used to form an inverse model based on a collection of ordered pairs of samples mapping the state space to the measurement space, that is, $\lbrace \vec x: \vec y \rbrace$. These can be generated either from models—e.g. state vectors from dynamical models and measurement vectors from radiative transfer or similar forward models—or from direct, empirical measurement. Other times when a statistical method might be more appropriate include highly nonlinear problems.

== List of methods ==
- Differential absorption spectroscopy
- Isoline retrieval
- Optimal estimation

== See also ==
- Collocation (remote sensing)
- Inverse problems
- Satellite meteorology
- Skew-T log-P diagram
- Thermodynamic diagrams
