= Colocation =

Colocation or collocation may refer to:

- Colocation (business), the placement of several entities in a single location
- Colocation centre, a data center where companies can rent equipment, space, and bandwidth for computing services, known as colocation services
- Collocation, in corpus linguistics, a sequence of words that often occur together
  - Collocation, a sub-type of phraseme
- Collocation method, used in mathematics to solve differential and integral equations
- Co-located office, form of organizational structure within the administrative system of the Chinese Communist Party and the People's Republic of China

== Technology and engineering ==
- Co-location (satellite), the placing of two or more geostationary communications satellites in orbit in close proximity
- Collocation (remote sensing), matching remote sensing measurements from two or more different instruments
- Collocation (operating systems), placing higher-level operating system code within a microkernel for improved performance
