= Semi-Lagrangian scheme =

The Semi-Lagrangian scheme (SLS) is a numerical method that is widely used in numerical weather prediction models for the integration of the equations governing atmospheric motion. A Lagrangian description of a system (such as the atmosphere) focuses on following individual air parcels along their trajectories as opposed to the Eulerian description, which considers the rate of change of system variables fixed at a particular point in space. A semi-Lagrangian scheme uses Eulerian framework but the discrete equations come from the Lagrangian perspective.

== Some background ==
The Lagrangian rate of change of a quantity $F$ is given by

$\frac{DF}{Dt} = \frac{\partial F}{\partial t} + (\mathbf{v}\cdot\vec\nabla)F,$

where $F$ can be a scalar or vector field and $\mathbf{v}$ is the velocity field. The first term on the right-hand side of the above equation is the local or Eulerian rate of change of $F$ and the second term is often called the advection term. Note that the Lagrangian rate of change is also known as the material derivative.

It can be shown that the equations governing atmospheric motion can be written in the Lagrangian form

$\frac{D\mathbf{V}}{Dt} = \mathbf{S}(\mathbf{V}),$

where the components of the vector $\mathbf{V}$ are the (dependent) variables describing a parcel of air (such as velocity, pressure, temperature etc.) and the function $\mathbf{S}(\mathbf{V})$ represents source and/or sink terms.

In a Lagrangian scheme, individual air parcels are traced but there are clearly certain drawbacks: the number of parcels can be very large indeed and it may often happen for a large number of parcels to cluster together, leaving relatively large regions of space completely empty. Such voids can cause computational problems, e.g. when calculating spatial derivatives of various quantities. There are ways round this, such as the technique known as Smoothed Particle Hydrodynamics, where a dependent variable is expressed in non-local form, i.e. as an integral of itself times a kernel function.

Semi-Lagrangian schemes avoid the problem of having regions of space essentially free of parcels.

== The Semi-Lagrangian scheme ==
Semi-Lagrangian schemes use a regular (Eulerian) grid, just like finite difference methods. The idea is this: at every time step the point where a parcel originated from is calculated. An interpolation scheme is then utilized to estimate the value of the dependent variable at the grid points surrounding the point where the particle originated from. The references listed contain more details on how the Semi-Lagrangian scheme is applied.

== See also ==
- Lagrangian and Eulerian specification of the flow field
- Contour advection
- Trajectory (fluid mechanics)
- Immersed boundary methods
- Stochastic Eulerian Lagrangian methods
- Advection schemes
