= Tropical Storm Usagi (2018) =

Pacific severe tropical storm in 2018

Severe Tropical Storm Usagi (Samuel)
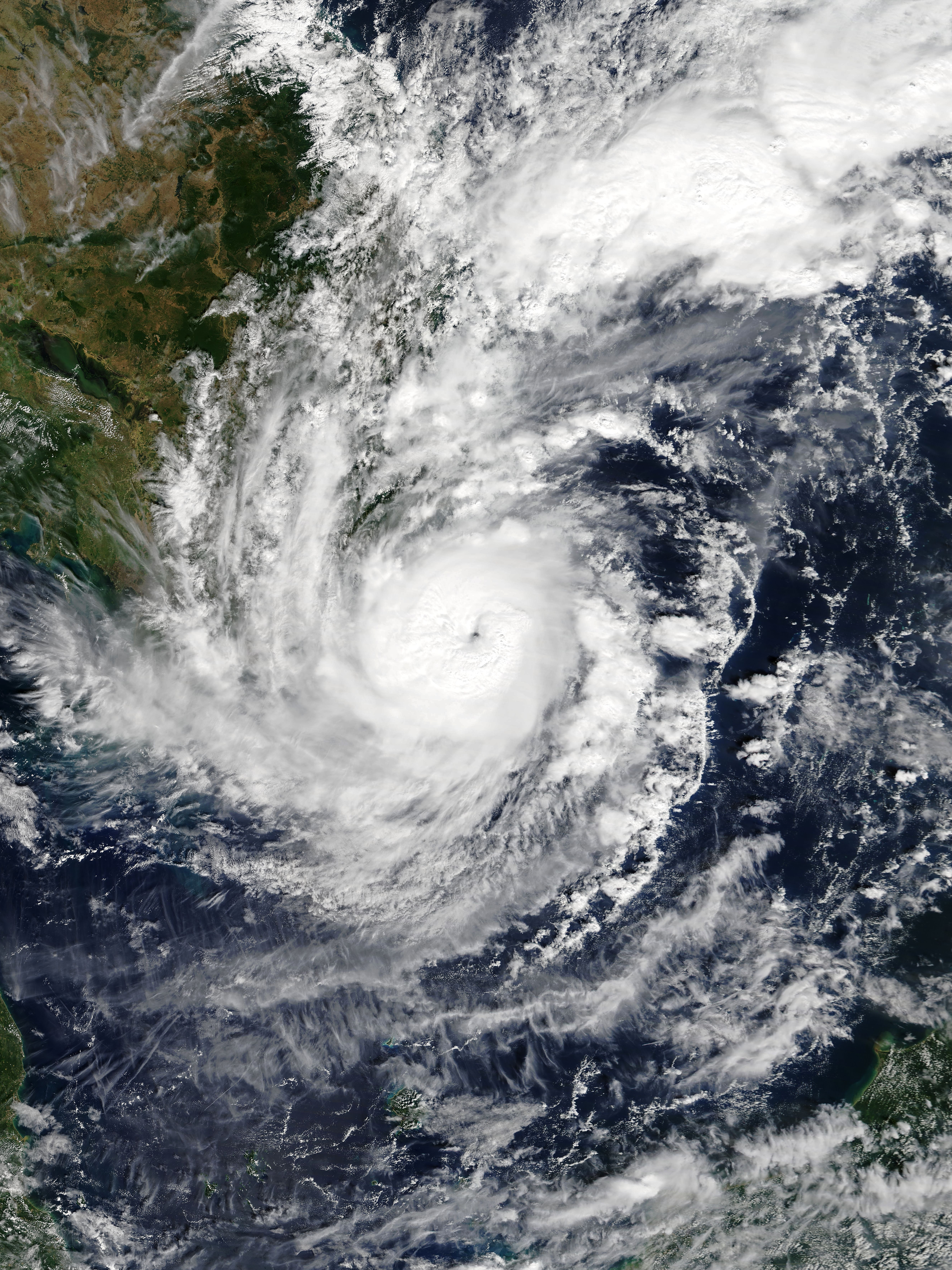
- Severe Tropical Storm Usagi at peak intensity on November 24

Meteorological history
- Formed: November 13, 2018
- Dissipated: November 27, 2018

Severe tropical storm
- 10-minute sustained (JMA)
- Highest winds: 110 km/h (70 mph)
- Lowest pressure: 990 hPa (mbar); 29.23 inHg

Category 2-equivalent typhoon
- 1-minute sustained (SSHWS/JTWC)
- Highest winds: 165 km/h (105 mph)
- Lowest pressure: 971 hPa (mbar); 28.67 inHg

Overall effects
- Fatalities: 4
- Damage: $40.8 million (2018 USD)
- Areas affected: Marshall Islands, Caroline Islands, Philippines, Vietnam
- IBTrACS
- Part of the 2018 Pacific typhoon season

Severe Tropical Storm Usagi, (Note: The name Usagi (Japanese: ウサギ, [ɯ̟sa̠ɡʲi]) was contributed by Japan and refers to the constellation Lepus, the hare, in Japanese.) known in the Philippines as Tropical Storm Samuel, was a tropical cyclone that affected the Philippines and Southern Vietnam in late November 2018. Usagi caused severe damage around the Visayas region and Ho Chi Minh City. The storm formed from a disturbance in the Central Pacific basin on November 3, but did not develop into a tropical storm until almost three weeks later, on November 13.

Usagi underwent rapid intensification and peaked in intensity before making its final landfall on Vũng Tàu, Bà Rịa–Vũng Tàu province as a weakening tropical storm on November 25. While never considered as a typhoon by the Japan Meteorological Agency (JMA), the Joint Typhoon Warning Center (JTWC) assessed its intensity to be equivalent to Category 2 status on the Saffir–Simpson scale. Usagi caused one death and ₱52.2 million (US$992,000) in damages in the Philippines, most of which came from agriculture. Usagi caused 3 deaths and ₫925 billion (US$39.8 million) in damages in Vietnam.

== Meteorological history ==
Map plotting the storm's track and intensity, according to the Saffir–Simpson scale Map key Saffir–Simpson scale Tropical depression (≤38 mph, ≤62 km/h) Tropical storm (39–73 mph, 63–118 km/h) Category 1 (74–95 mph, 119–153 km/h) Category 2 (96–110 mph, 154–177 km/h) Category 3 (111–129 mph, 178–208 km/h) Category 4 (130–156 mph, 209–251 km/h) Category 5 (≥157 mph, ≥252 km/h) Unknown Storm type Tropical cyclone Subtropical cyclone Extratropical cyclone, remnant low, tropical disturbance, or monsoon depression

On November 3, the Central Pacific Hurricane Center began monitoring a disturbance that had formed in the Central Pacific basin. Without further development on November 6, the disturbance moved out of the basin and into the West Pacific, where the system was first monitored by the Joint Typhoon Warning Center (JTWC) at 22:00 UTC, assessing its potential of developing into a tropical cyclone within the next 24 hours as low. The system was within favorable conditions for development, with low vertical wind shear and sea surface temperatures reaching 28–30 °C (82–86 °F). The system's tropical cyclone development potential within 24 hours was further upgraded to medium by the JTWC as its broad low-level circulation began to consolidate; however, atmospheric convection was disorganized. On November 9, at 01:30 UTC, the JTWC issued a Tropical Cyclone Formation Alert (TCFA) for the system and upgraded the system's tropical cyclone development potential within 24 hours to high. By the next day, however, the low-level circulation became almost fully exposed as wind shear of 15–25 knots (28–46 km/h; 17–29 mph) displaced the system's convection towards the east, prompting the JTWC to cancel the TCFA and downgrade the system's tropical cyclone development potential within 24 hours to medium. On November 11, the JTWC further lowered the system's tropical cyclone development potential within 24 hours to low as the system's low-level circulation became fully exposed and ill-defined.

On November 13, at 00:00 UTC, the Japan Meteorological Agency (JMA) assessed that the system had developed into a tropical depression near the Marshall Islands. (Note: The JMA is the official Regional Specialized Meteorological Centre for the northwestern Pacific Ocean.) Continuing westwards, wind shear decreased, with the JTWC upgrading the system's tropical cyclone development potential within 24 hours to medium on November 14. The PAGASA began monitoring the system, and on November 17, at 12:00 UTC, the JTWC upgraded the system to a tropical depression, assigning it the designation 33W. Despite dry air surrounding the system, convective activity continued alongside anticyclonic outflow. On November 18, at 03:00 UTC, 33W entered the Philippine Area of Responsibility and was assigned the local name Samuel by the PAGASA. Turning northwest, the system's low-level circulation was broad, ill-defined, and elongated, with wind shear at 25–30 knots (46–56 km/h; 29–35 mph) displacing convection over 100 nautical miles (190 km; 120 mi) to the west of the low-level circulation. 33W made landfall on Hernani, Eastern Samar on November 20, at 17:00 UTC, with the JTWC downgrading it to a disturbance an hour later as the system's convection fragmented. After turning west-southwestward, 33W made 4 more landfalls over Cebu, Negros Occidental, and Iloilo between 22:00 UTC and 02:00 UTC on the next day. Now in the Sulu Sea, the system's low-level circulation moved closer to convection, and on November 21, at 12:00 UTC, the JTWC upgraded 33W back to a tropical depression. 33W made landfall on Araceli, Palawan at 13:00 UTC and moved into the South China Sea afterwards.

On November 22, at 00:00 UTC, both the JMA and the JTWC upgraded 33W to a tropical storm as deep convection covered the system's low-level circulation, with the former assigning it the name Usagi. Now in a favorable environment with low wind shear, the system's low-level circulation slowly consolidated and became better defined despite still being partially exposed. Usagi exited the Philippine Area of Responsibility at 10:00 UTC; it continued consolidating as rainbands wrapped into the system's center. On November 23, an eye appeared on SSMIS microwave imagery, and at 06:00 UTC, the JMA upgraded Usagi to a severe tropical storm. The JTWC upgraded Usagi to a typhoon later that day. On November 24, at 00:00 UTC, both the JMA and the JTWC estimated Usagi to have peaked, with the JMA estimating maximum 10-minute sustained winds of 110 kilometres per hour (70 mph) alongside a minimum central pressure of 990 hPa (29.23 inHg) and the JTWC estimating maximum 1-minute sustained winds of 165 kilometres per hour (105 mph). An eye briefly appeared on satellite imagery before becoming filled with clouds. Later in the day, a combination of land interaction and unfavorable environmental conditions caused Usagi to weaken as its convective structure deteriorated. Rainbands collapsed as the system turned northwest, and by November 25, both the JMA and the JTWC had downgraded Usagi to a tropical storm as central convection weakened. Usagi made landfall on Vũng Tàu at 07:00 UTC, with the JTWC downgrading Usagi to a tropical depression later that day. During November 26, the JMA also downgraded Usagi to a tropical depression as the JTWC further downgraded Usagi to a disturbance. Usagi dissipated over Cambodia at 00:00 UTC on November 27.

== Preparations, impact, and aftermath ==
=== Philippines ===
In preparation for the storm, the PAGASA raised signal #1 warnings in Visayas and Mindanao. People were advised to not set sail east of Visayas and Mindanao as the storm moved closer.

Flooding was reported in Iloilo City, with over 7,800 passengers being stranded throughout various ports throughout the country. 14 flights were also cancelled due to bad weather caused by the storm. Usagi caused one death in the Philippines, with agricultural damages being estimated at ₱52.2 million (US$992,000). 124,226 people were affected, 21,224 people were displaced, 4,967 people were evacuated, and 2,746 houses were damaged. Several landslides were reported during the storm's passage, all of which were in the island of Samar. Basco recorded a gust of 18 metres per second (65 km/h; 40 mph), with Cuyo recording 291.4 millimetres (11.47 in) of rain in 24 hours and 314 millimetres (12.4 in) of rain in total.

₱6.9 million (US$132 thousand) was provided to assist those affected, with ₱3 million (US$56 thousand) being provided by the Department of Social Welfare and Development and the rest by other organizations.

Highest Tropical Cyclone Wind Signal Raised
Signal No.	Places Raised
1	Agusan del Norte, Agusan del Sur, Aklan, Antique, Biliran, Bohol, Camiguin, Capiz, Cebu, Dinagat Islands, Eastern Samar, Iloilo, Guimaras, Leyte, Masbate, Misamis Oriental, Negros Occidental, Negros Oriental, Northern Samar, southern Occidental Mindoro, southern Oriental Mindoro, Palawan, Romblon, Samar, Siquijor, Southern Leyte, Surigao del Norte, Surigao del Sur

=== Vietnam ===
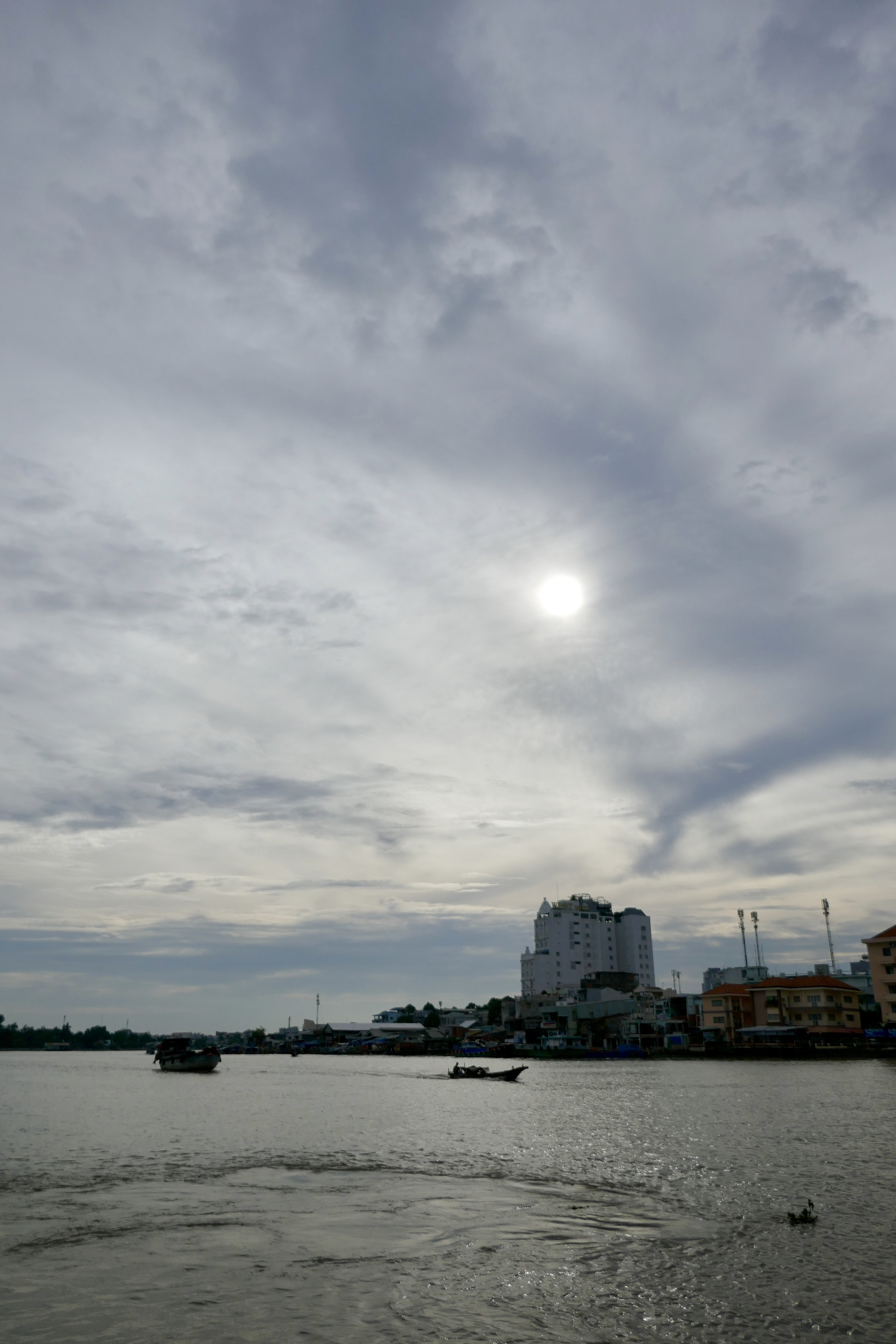
Cloudy skies in Cần Thơ on November 24

88,787 people were mobilized to aid in the storm response, with 1 thousand police officers and officials being prepared in Cần Giờ District. Classes in Ho Chi Minh City were suspended on November 26, with Cần Giờ suspending classes until November 27. 270 thousand students were affected after Khánh Hòa suspended classes. A heavy rain warning was issued for the Central Highlands and the provinces between Bình Thuận and Thừa Thiên Huế. A flood warning was also issued for the Central Highlands, the Southeast, and the provinces between Quảng Trị and Bình Thuận. A total of 160 thousand people were evacuated from several localities.

Tân Bình District recorded 407.6 millimetres (16 in) of rain, surpassing the district's record of most rainfall. 60 roads were flooded in Ho Chi Minh City; three people were killed. Rainfall totals in Ho Chi Minh City averaged 300–400 millimetres (12–16 in), with many buildings remaining partially flooded after Usagi's passage. Flooding on some roads reached 1 metre (3.3 ft) deep. 14 fishermen were rescued; losses from damaged lobster, shrimp, and fish farms were estimated at ₫12 billion (US$516,000). A 300 metres (980 ft) stretch of the North–South railway was washed away in Công Hải. 300 families on the island of Bình Lập were stranded after the bridge connecting the island to the mainland washed away. 46 ships sunk as a result of the storm, with 42 square kilometres (16 mi^{2}) of crops being flooded. 51 houses were damaged, with 160,000 thousand people being evacuated. Losses in Vietnam were estimated at ₫925 billion (US$39.8 million).

Following the passage of Usagi, local health departments were instructed to monitor water quality and sanitation by the Ministry of Health.

== See also ==
- Weather of 2018
- Tropical cyclones in 2018
- Tropical Depression Wilma (2013)
- Typhoon Tembin (2017)
- Tropical Storm Bebinca (2018)
- Tropical Storm Toraji (2018)
