= Microwave radiometer =

Tool measuring EM radiation at 0.3–300-GHz frequency

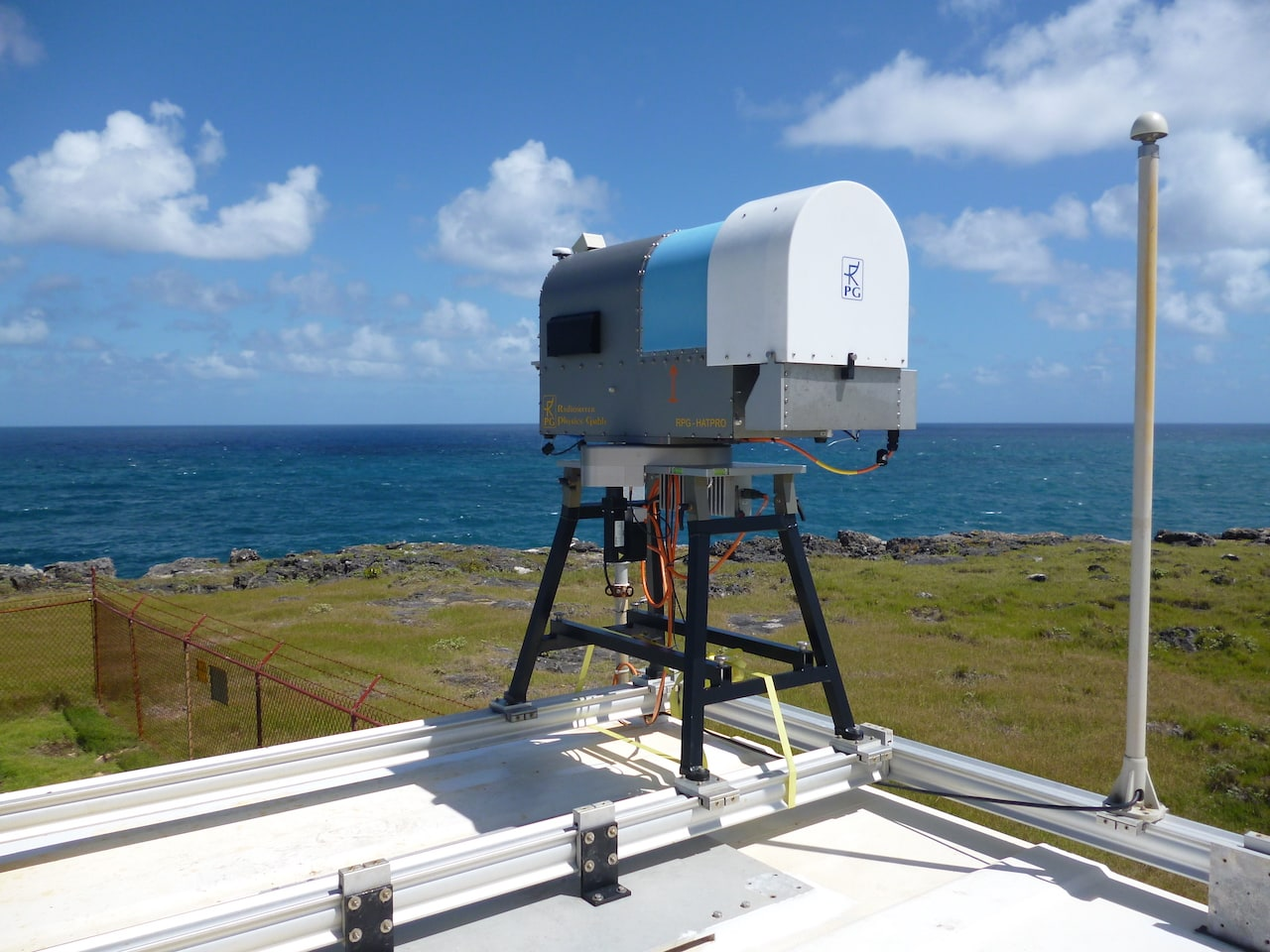
Humidity and Temperature Profiler (HATPRO-SUNHAT) at the Barbados Clouds Observatory.

A microwave radiometer (MWR) is a radiometer that measures energy emitted at one millimeter-to-metre wavelengths (frequencies of 0.3–300 GHz) known as microwaves. Microwave radiometers are very sensitive receivers designed to measure thermally-emitted electromagnetic radiation. They are usually equipped with multiple receiving channels to derive the characteristic emission spectrum of planetary atmospheres, surfaces or extraterrestrial objects. Microwave radiometers are utilized in a variety of environmental and engineering applications, including remote sensing, weather forecasting, climate monitoring, radio astronomy and radio propagation studies.

Using the microwave spectral range between 1 and 300 GHz provides complementary information to the visible and infrared spectral range. Most importantly, the atmosphere and also vegetation is semi-transparent in the microwave spectral range. This means components like dry gases, water vapor, or hydrometeors interact with microwave radiation but overall even the cloudy atmosphere is not completely opaque in this frequency range.

For weather and climate monitoring, microwave radiometers are operated from space as well as from the ground. As remote sensing instruments, they are designed to operate continuously and autonomously often in combination with other atmospheric remote sensors like for example cloud radars and lidars. They allow the derivation of important meteorological quantities such as vertical temperature and humidity profiles, columnar water vapor quantity, and columnar liquid water path with a high temporal resolution on the order of minutes to seconds under nearly all weather conditions. Microwave radiometers are also used for remote sensing of Earth's ocean and land surfaces, to derive ocean temperature and wind speed, ice characteristics, and soil and vegetation properties.

== History ==
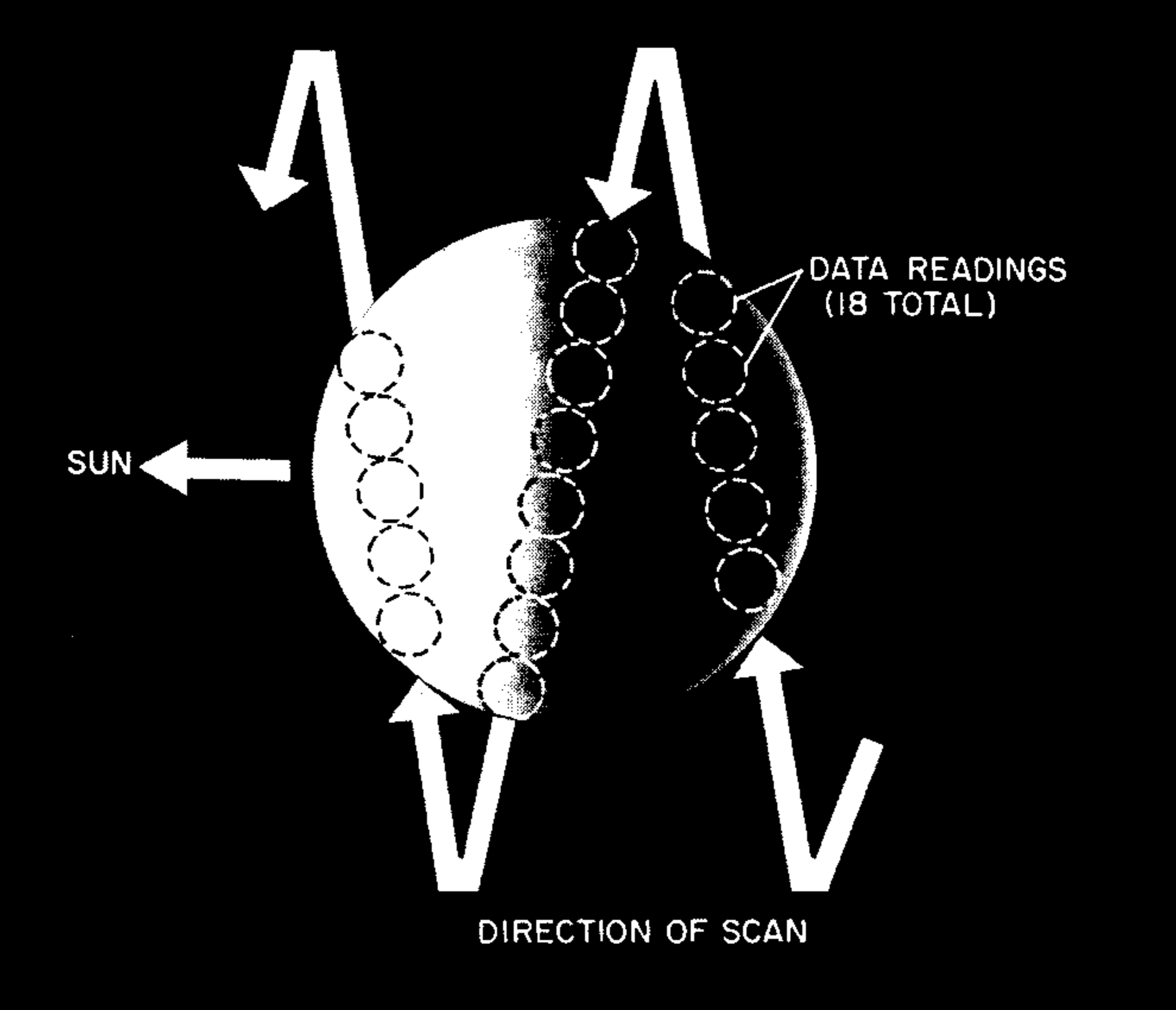
Radiometric scanning for Venus by Mariner 2, for its December 1962 flyby of that planet

First developments of microwave radiometer were dedicated to the measurement of radiation of extraterrestrial origin in the 1930s and 1940s. The most common form of microwave radiometer was introduced by Robert Dicke in 1946 in the wartime Radiation Laboratory of Massachusetts Institute of Technology to better determine the temperature of the microwave background radiation. This first radiometer worked at a wavelength 1.25 cm and was operated at the Massachusetts Institute of Technology. Dicke also first discovered weak atmospheric microwave absorption using three different radiometers (at wavelengths of 1.0, 1.25 and 1.5 cm).

Soon after satellites were first used for observing the atmosphere, microwave radiometers became part of their instrumentation. In 1962 the Mariner-2 mission was launched by NASA to investigate the surface of Venus including a radiometer for water vapor and temperature observations. In following years a wide variety of microwave radiometers were tested on satellites. The launch of the Scanning Multichannel Microwave Radiometer in 1978 became an important milestone in the history of radiometry. It was the first time a conically scanning radiometer was used in space; it was launched into space on board the NASA Nimbus satellite. The launch of this mission gave the opportunity to image the Earth at a constant angle of incidence that is important as surface emissivity is angle dependent. In the beginning of 1980, new multi-frequency, dual-polarization radiometric instruments were developed. Two spacecraft were launched which carried instruments of this type: Nimbus-7 and Seasat. The Nimbus-7 mission results allowed to globally monitor the state of ocean surface as well as surface covered by snow and glaciers. Today, microwave instruments like the Advanced Microwave Sounding Unit (AMSU) and the Special Sensor Microwave Imager / Sounder (SSMIS) are widely used on different satellites.

Ground-based radiometers for the determination of temperature profiles were first explored in the 1960s and have since improved in terms of reduced noise and the ability to run unattended 24/7 within worldwide observational networks. Review articles, and a detailed online handbook are available.

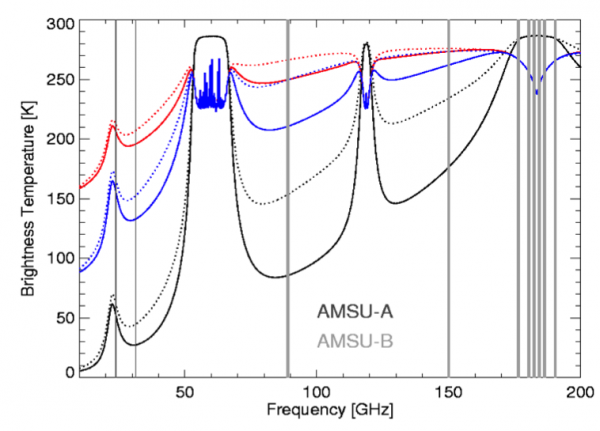
Microwave spectrum: The black lines show the simulated spectrum for a ground-based receiver; the colored lines are the spectrum obtained from a satellite instrument over the ocean measuring at horizontal (blue) and vertical (red) linear polarization. Solid lines indicate simulations for clear-sky (cloud-free) conditions, dotted lines show a clear-sky case with a single layer liquid cloud. The vertical lines indicate typical frequencies used by satellite sensors like the AMSU radiometer.

== Principle of operation ==
Solids, liquids (e.g. the Earth's surface, ocean, sea ice, snow, vegetation) but also gases emit and absorb microwave radiation. Traditionally, the amount of radiation a microwave radiometer receives is expressed as the equivalent blackbody temperature also called brightness temperature. In the microwave range several atmospheric gases exhibit rotational lines. They provide specific absorption features shown at a figure on the right which allow to derive information about their abundance and vertical structure. Examples for such absorption features are the oxygen absorption complex (caused by magnetic dipole transitions) around 60 GHz which is used to derive temperature profiles or the water vapor absorption line around 22.235 GHz (dipole rotational transition) which is used to observe the vertical profile of humidity. Other significant absorption lines are found at 118.75 GHz (oxygen absorption) and at 183.31 GHz (water vapor absorption, used for water vapor profiling under dry conditions or from satellites). Weak absorption features due to ozone are also used for stratospheric ozone density and temperature profiling.

Besides the distinct absorption features of molecular transition lines, there are also non-resonant contributions by hydrometeors (liquid drops and frozen particles). Liquid water emission increases with frequency, hence, measuring at two frequencies, typically one close to the water absorption line (22.235 GHz) and one in the nearby window region (typically 31 GHz) dominated by liquid absorption provides information on both the columnar amount of water vapor and the columnar amount of liquid water separately (two-channel radiometer). The so-called „water vapor continuum" arises from the contribution of far away water vapor lines.

Larger rain drops as well as larger frozen hydrometeors (snow, graupel, hail) also scatter microwave radiation especially at higher frequencies (>90 GHz). These scattering effects can be used to distinguish between rain and cloud water content exploiting polarized measurements but also to constrain the columnar amount of snow and ice particles from space and from the ground.

== Design ==
A microwave radiometer consists of an antenna system, microwave radio-frequency components (front-end) and a back-end for signal processing at intermediate frequencies.

The key element is the Dicke switch, which alternately switches between the antenna and a cryogenic load at a known temperature. A calculation from the change in noise level, gives the sky temperature.

The atmospheric signal is very weak and the signal needs to be amplified by around 80 dB. Therefore, heterodyne techniques are often used to convert the signal down to lower frequencies that allow the use of commercial amplifiers and signal processing. Increasingly low noise amplifiers are becoming available at higher frequencies, i.e. up to 100 GHz, making heterodyne techniques obsolete. Thermal stabilization is highly important to avoid receiver drifts.

Usually ground-based radiometers are also equipped with environmental sensors (rain, temperature, humidity) and GPS receivers (time and location reference). The antenna itself often measures through a window made of foam which is transparent in the microwave spectrum to keep the antenna clean of dust, liquid water and ice. Often, also a heated blower system is attached the radiometer which helps to keep the window free of liquid drops or dew (strong emitters in the MW) but also free of ice and snow.

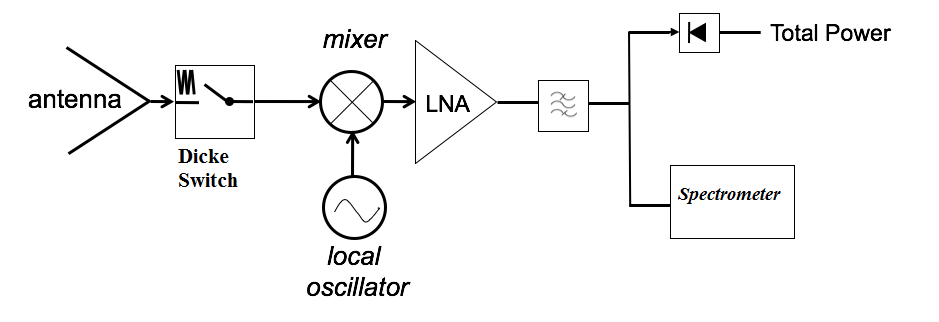
Schematic diagram of a microwave radiometer using the heterodyne principle.

As seen from the figure above, after the radiofrequency signal is received at the antenna it is downconverted to the intermediate frequency with the help of a stable local oscillator signal. After amplification with a Low Noise Amplifier and band pass filtering the signal can be detected in full power mode, by splitting or splitting it into multiple frequency bands with a spectrometer. For high-frequency calibrations a Dicke switch is used here.

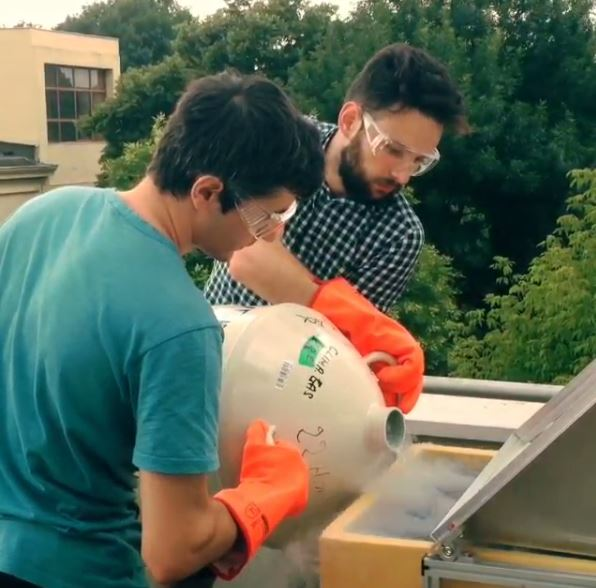
Microwave Radiometer calibration performed by employees of Research Center of R&D in Optoelectronics, Magurele (Romania).

== Calibration ==
The calibration of microwave radiometer sets the basis for accurate measured brightness temperatures and therefore, for accurate retrieved atmospheric parameters as temperature profiles, integrated water vapor and liquid water path. The simplest version of a calibration is a so-called "hot-cold" calibration using two reference blackbodies at known, but different, "hot" and "cold" temperatures, i.e. assuming a linear relation between input power and output voltage of the detector. Knowing the physical temperatures of the references, their brightness temperatures can be calculated and directly related to detected voltages of the radiometer, hence, the linear relationship between brightness temperatures and voltages can be obtained.

The temperatures of the calibration targets should be chosen such that they span the full measurement range. Ground-based radiometers usually use an ambient temperature target as "hot" reference. As a cold target one can use either a liquid nitrogen cooled blackbody (77 K) or a zenith clear sky TB that was obtained indirectly from radiative transfer theory. Satellites use a heated target as "hot" reference and the cosmic background radiation as "cold" reference. To increase the accuracy and stability of MWR calibrations further calibration targets, such as internal noise sources, or Dicke switches can be used.

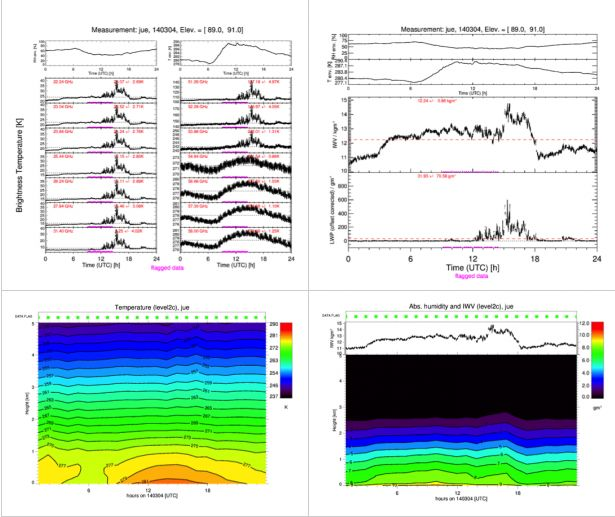
Time series from 14 April 2015 for (a) brightness temperatures measured at 7 different frequencies in the K (right) and V (left) bands, (b) retrieved vertically Integrated Water Vapor (IWV) and cloud Liquid Water Path (LWP), (c) temperature profiles from 0 to 5 km, (d) absolute humidity profiles from 0 to 5 km.

== Retrieval of temperature and water vapor profiles ==
The retrieval of physical quantities using microwave radiometry (e.g. temperature or water vapor profiles) is not straightforward and comprehensive retrieval algorithms (using inversion techniques like optimal estimation approach) have been developed.

Temperature profiles are obtained by measuring along the oxygen absorption complex at 60 GHz. The emission at any altitude is proportional to the temperature and density of oxygen. As oxygen is homogeneously distributed within the atmosphere and around the globe, the brightness temperature signals can be used to derive the temperature profile. Signals at the center of the absorption complex are dominated by the atmosphere closest to the radiometer (when ground-based). Moving into the window region, the signal is a superposition from close and far regions of the atmosphere. The combination of several channels contains therefore information about the vertical temperature distribution. A similar approach is used to derive vertical profiles of water vapor utilizing its absorption line at 22.235 GHz and also around the 183.31 GHz absorption line.

== Satellite instrumentation ==
Microwave instruments are flown on several polar orbiting satellites for Earth observation and operational meteorology as well as part of extraterrestrial missions.

One distinguishes between imaging instruments that are used with conical scanning for remote sensing of the Earth surface, e.g. AMSR, SSMI, WINDSAT, and sounding instruments that are operated in cross-track mode, e.g. ATMS/MHS. The first type uses lower frequencies (1–100 GHz) in atmospheric windows to observe sea-surface salinity, soil moisture, sea-surface temperature, wind speed over ocean, precipitation and snow. Other than optical earth observation sensors, passive microwave can be used do determine the snow water equivalent (liquit water content of snow) by comparing various frequencies. The second type is used to measure along absorption lines to retrieve temperature and humidity profile. Furthermore, limb sounders, e.g., MLS, are used to retrieve trace gas profiles in the upper atmosphere.

Other examples of microwave radiometers on meteorological satellites include the Special Sensor Microwave/Imager, Scanning Multichannel Microwave Radiometer, WindSat, Microwave Sounding Unit and Microwave Humidity Sounder. The Microwave Imaging Radiometer with Aperture Synthesis is an interferometer/imaging radiometer capable of resolving soil moisture and salinity over small regions of surface.

== Spaceprobe instruments ==
By the 2010s four microwave radiometers have been flown on interplanetary spacecraft. The first was Mariner 2, which used a microwave instrument to determine the high surface temperature of Venus was coming from the surface not higher up in the atmosphere. There are/were also radiometers on the Juno Jupiter probe, the Rosetta comet probe, and Cassini-Huygens..

The Juno probe, launched in 2011, is characterizing the atmosphere of Jupiter using a microwave radiometer suite. The Microwave Radiometer (MWR) instrument on Juno has several antennas observing in several different microwave wavelengths to penetrate the top cloud layer of the planet, and detect features, temperatures, and chemical abundances there. The MWR instrument was also used to provided an estimate of Europa's ice shell thickness.

== Ground-based networks ==
MWRnet is a network established in 2009 of scientists working with ground-based microwave radiometers. MWRnet aims to facilitate the exchange of information in the MWR user community fostering the participation to coordinated international projects. In the long run, MWRnet’s mission aims at setting up operational software, quality control procedures, data formats, etc. similar to other successful networks such as EARLINET, AERONET, CWINDE.
