= Violet B. Haas =

American applied mathematician

- Born: November 23, 1926; Brooklyn, New York, U.S.
- Died: January 21, 1986 (aged 59); Lafayette, Indiana, U.S.
- Education: Brooklyn College; Massachusetts Institute of Technology
- Spouse: Felix Haas
- Children: 3
- Scientific career
- Fields: Control theory, optimal estimation
- Workplaces: University of Detroit Mercy; Purdue University College of Engineering
- Doctoral advisor: Norman Levinson

Violet Bushwick Haas (November 23, 1926 – January 21, 1986) was an American applied mathematician specializing in control theory and optimal estimation who became a professor of electrical engineering at Purdue University College of Engineering.

== Early life and education ==
Haas was born November 23, 1926, in Brooklyn. She completed a A.B. in mathematics at Brooklyn College in 1947. Haas earned a M.S. (1949) and Ph.D. (1951) in mathematics from the MIT Department of Mathematics (MIT). Her dissertation was titled Singular perturbations of an ordinary differential equation. Norman Levinson was her doctoral advisor. She met her future husband, Felix Haas, a fellow mathematician at MIT. Haas was selected as an American Association of University Women Vassie James Hill Fellow in 1951. She was a member of Phi Beta Kappa, Sigma Xi, and Eta Kappa Nu.

== Career ==
Haas was a lecturer at Immaculata College from 1952 to 1955 and an instructor at the University of Connecticut from 1955 to 1956. She was a faculty member at the University of Detroit from 1957 to 1962. Haas also taught at Wayne State University.

She joined the faculty at Purdue University in January 1962 as an assistant professor in the college of electrical engineering and computer engineering. By 1978, Haas was a full professor of electrical engineering in the Purdue University College of Engineering. Her areas of expertise included optimal control, nonlinear control, and optimal estimation. Due to nepotism rules (her husband was a fellow mathematician), Haas took a position in electrical engineering rather than mathematics.

Haas advocated for women in STEM fields. Some of her earlier academic environments were hostile to women. In a few instances, she was the only department member excluded from grant proposals. This had largely improved by the early 1980s. For 15 years, Haas was the counselor of the Purdue University student chapter of the Society of Women Engineers.

Haas joined the Association for Women in Mathematics in 1975, serving as a coordinator for the speakers' bureau. She was a member of the Institute of Electrical and Electronics Engineers (IEEE) committee on professional opportunities for women and the American Society for Engineering Education (ASEE) constituent committee on women in engineering. For Haas' support and encouragement of women students in engineering, in 1977, she was elected as one of five "Very Important Women" on campus by the Association of Women Students. In 1977, Haas received the D.D. Ewing Award as an outstanding teacher in the Purdue School of Electrical Engineering. She received the 1978 Helen B. Schleman Medallion Award for her service and encouragement of women in academic and professional areas. In the 1970s, Haas was a nominee for the distinguished science award of the Society of Women Engineers.

From 1983 to 1984, Haas was a visiting professor at Massachusetts Institute of Technology through the National Science Foundation visiting professorships for women program. In this position, she was a full time researcher investigating control theory and infinite dimensional control problems.

Haas was active in the control systems community and was on the program committee of the American Control Conference. She was also the Society for Industrial and Applied Mathematics (SIAM) representative to the IEEE conference on decision and control. Mathematician and colleague Pamela G. Coxson stated that Haas' involvement "increased the participation of the mathematical community in these two annual conferences." She is included in biographical listings of Who's Who in the Midwest, Who's Who of American Women, and American Men and Women of Science. She was a former editor of the Women in Engineering Students Newsletter. Haas was a member of the American Association of University Women, League of Women Voters, YWCA, and served on the board of directors of the Lafayette Symphony.

Haas and sociologist Carolyn C. Perrucci co-edited the book Women in Scientific and Engineering Professions. University of Michigan Press. 1984. ISBN 978-0-472-10049-1.

Eight months after leaving MIT in 1984, Haas was diagnosed with a brain tumor and was soon unconscious.

== Personal life ==
Haas resided in West Lafayette, Indiana. She was married to Felix Haas. They had a daughter and two sons.

Haas was unconscious from a brain tumor from 1984 until her death on the morning of January 21, 1986, at St. Elizabeth Hospital.

In 1990, the Council on the Status of Women at Purdue University established Violet B. Haas award that recognizes people who promote the status of women at the university.
