= SMEI =

SMEI may refer to:

- Severe myoclonic epilepsy of infancy (SMEI), also known as Dravet's syndrome, a form of generalized epilepsy with febrile seizures plus.
- Borderline SMEI (SMEB), a related condition to the above.
- The Solar Mass Ejection Imager aboard the Coriolis satellite.

== See also ==
- Smei, a village near Costeşti, Romania
- Sales & Marketing Executives International
