= SSMIS =

The Special Sensor Microwave Imager / Sounder (SSMIS) is a 24-channel, 21-frequency, linearly polarized passive microwave radiometer system. The instrument is flown on board the United States Air Force Defense Meteorological Satellite Program (DMSP) F-16, F-17, F-18 and F-19 satellites, which were launched in October 2003, November 2006, October 2009, and April 2014, respectively. It is the successor to the Special Sensor Microwave/Imager (SSM/I). The SSMIS on the F19 satellite stopped producing useful data in February 2016.

The Department of Defense announced it would cut off access to SSMIS data useful for calculating depth of sea ice and location of hurricanes, as of July 31, 2025.

In late July 2025, the Department of Defense announced it will keep the SSMIS data flowing until the sensor fails or the program formally ends in September 2026.

== Instrument characteristics ==
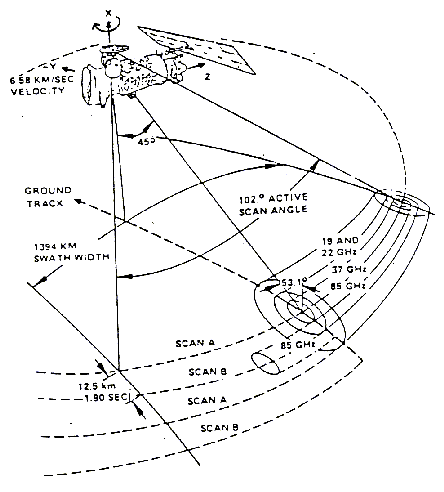
The scan geometry of the SSM/I(SSMIS have scan angle 143.2 grad)

The SSMIS sensor is a passive conically scanning microwave radiometer that combines and extends the current imaging and sounding capabilities of three previously separate DMSP microwave sensors: the SSM/T-1 temperature sounder, the SSMI/T- 2 moisture sounder, and the SSM/I. The SSMIS instrument measures microwave energy at 24 discrete frequencies from 19 to 183 GHz with a swath width of 1700 km. The first SSMIS was launched aboard the DMSP-16 satellite on 18 October 2003. Due to a manufacturing mistake, the polarization for the channels at 50.3, 52.8, 53.6, 54.4 and 55.5 of the first unit of SSMIS (the one flying on DMSP-16) was reversed. Those five channels detect the vertical polarization rather than the Horizontal polarization detected by the successive units of SSMIS.

Radiometric characteristics of the SSMIS.
Channel #	Frequency (GHz)	Polarization	Along-track resolution (km)	Cross-track resolution (km)	Spatial sampling (km x km)	Instrument noise (K)
12	19.35	horizontal	73	47	45x74	0.35
13	19.35	vertical	73	47	45x74	0.35
14	22.235	vertical	73	47	45x74	0.45
15	37.0	horizontal	41	31	28x45	0.22
16	37.0	vertical	41	31	28x45	0.22
1	50.3	horizontal	17.6	27.3	37.5	0.34
2	52.8	horizontal	17.6	27.3	37.5	0.32
3	53.596	horizontal	17.6	27.3	37.5	0.33
4	54.4	horizontal	17.6	27.3	37.5	0.33
5	55.5	horizontal	17.6	27.3	37.5	0.34
6	57.29	right circular	17.6	27.3	37.5	0.41
7	59.4	right circular	17.6	27.3	37.5	0.40
19	63.283248 ± 0.285271	right circular	17.6	27.3	75	2.7
20	60.792668 ± 0.357892	right circular	17.6	27.3	75	2.7
21	60.792668 ± 0.357892 ± 0.002	right circular	17.6	27.3	75	1.9
22	60.792668 ± 0.357892 ± 0.0055	right circular	17.6	27.3	75	1.3
23	60.792668 ± 0.357892 ± 0.016	right circular	17.6	27.3	75	0.8
24	60.792668 ± 0.357892 ± 0.050	right circular	17.6	27.3	75	0.9
18	91.665	horizontal	14	13	13x16	0.19
17	91.665	vertical	14	13	13x16	0.19
8	150	horizontal	14	13	13x16	0.53
11	183.311 ± 1	horizontal	14	13	13x16	0.38
10	183.311 ± 3	horizontal	14	13	13x16	0.39
9	183.311 ± 6.6	horizontal	14	13	13x16	0.56
