= Carolyn C. Perrucci =

American sociologist

- Born: Carolyn Land Cummings
- Education: Middle Tennessee State University (BS); Purdue University (MS, PhD)
- Spouse: Robert Perrucci
- Children: 2
- Scientific career
- Fields: Sociology, women's studies
- Workplaces: Purdue University

Carolyn Cummings Perrucci (née Cummings) is an American sociologist specializing in gender roles, family, and education, who is currently a professor of sociology at Purdue University. She joined the Purdue University College of Liberal Arts department of sociology in 1966. Perrucci headed the women's studies program from 1980 to 1981 and has published several books on the career patterns of women in STEM fields.

== Early life and education ==
Carolyn Land Cummings was born in Murfreesboro, Tennessee to Kathleen McGraw Cummings and Clarence L. Cummings.

Perrucci graduated from Middle Tennessee State University a B.S. in sociology in 1961, receiving the Sims Award for most outstanding social science major. She subsequently earned an M.S. in 1963 and a PhD in 1965 at Purdue University, both in sociology. She is a member of Alpha Kappa Delta, Kappa Delta Pi, Phi Sigma Beta and Pi Gamma Mu.

== Career ==
In 1966, Perrucci joined Purdue University's faculty as an assistant professor of sociology. In 1967, she received a $15,713 grant from the United States Department of Labor to investigate why some women engineering and science graduates do not continue to work in those fields. Her study explored the impacts of social background, educational experiences, marriage, and childbearing on a woman's career. In March 1968, Perrucci spoke at the 10th International Seminar on Family Research in Tehran. Her presentation outlined why so few women in the U.S. pursue scientific and engineering careers.

In 1970, Perrucci was promoted to an associate professor of sociology at Purdue. She and her husband, Robert, were co-investigators on a research project titled "Social Processes in the Identification of Mental Illness," supported by a two-year grant from the National Institute of Mental Health. Also that year, she was appointed to a three-year term on the committee on training and professional standards of the American Sociological Association. During the spring of 1971, Perrucci was one of nine sociologists who attended the research workshop on sociology theory and research in education at Myrtle Beach, South Carolina. The workshop was hosted by the National Research Council's Committee on Basic Research in Education. In November 1971, Perrucci was funded by a $12,612 grant from the United States Office of Education to explore career patterns of men and women in engineering and science as part of a program sponsored by the National Academy of Sciences and the National Academy of Education.

In 1973, Perrucci was one of 14 individuals awarded a faculty research fellowship from the Ford Foundation to support research on the changing role of women in the United States. With the $18,245 grant, she studied the "social determinants and patterns of socioeconomic achievement among women college graduates." Perrucci's research was supplemented by a $16,418 grant from the National Institute of Child Health & Human Development. Her scientific aims were to examine the effects of "selected family-building variables on women's graduate education and socioeconomic achievement." And to "...document the process of stratification for women college graduates." Perrucci and Deena B. Targ coauthored a related book, Marriage and the Family: A Critical Analysis and Proposals for Change. David McKay Company. 1974. ISBN 978-0-679-30248-3.

In 1980, Perrucci was promoted to head of the women's studies program at Purdue University's College of Liberal Arts. The following year, she won the Purdue University Helen B. B. Schleman Gold Medallion award for her service and "encouragement of women in academic and professional areas." She researched the "sociology of occupations and professions, of sex roles, of education, and of the family." Perrucci and applied mathematician Violet B. Haas co-edited the book Women in Scientific and Engineering Professions. University of Michigan Press. 1984. ISBN 978-0-472-10049-1. Perrucci was promoted to full professor of sociology in 1986. In 1988, Perrucci, Robert Perrucci, Deena B. Targ, and Harry R. Targ coauthored the book, Plant Closings: International Context and Social Costs. De Gruyter. 1988. ISBN 978-0-202-30338-3.

In 1990, Perrucci received the Aida Tomeh distinguished service award from the North Central Sociological Association. In 1991, she was given the Violet Haas recognition award from the Council on the Status of Women at Purdue University and was honored with the outstanding teaching award from the school's department of sociology and anthropology. From 1992 to 1998, she was the associate dean of the Purdue University Graduate School. In 1997, Purdue's School of Liberal Arts recognized Perrucci as a distinguished alumna. The women's studies department endowed an undergraduate achievement award in her name. She headed the department from 1998 to 2003.

== Personal life ==
Cummings married sociologist Robert Perrucci. The couple have a daughter and a son. She is the niece of former Secretary of State of Tennessee James H. Cummings.
