= Women in Scientific and Engineering Professions =

1984 book by Haas and Perrucci

- Title page for Women in Scientific and Engineering Professions (1984)
- Author: Violet B. Haas, Carolyn C. Perrucci
- Language: English
- Genre: Non-fiction
- Publisher: University of Michigan Press
- Publication date: 1984
- Publication place: United States

Women in Scientific and Engineering Professions is a 1984 book co-edited by American authors Violet B. Haas and Carolyn C. Perrucci. It was published through University of Michigan Press. The book was reviewed in several academic journals.
