= Pamela G. Coxson =

American applied mathematician

- Education: University of Southern California
- Scientific career
- Fields: Applied mathematics
- Workplaces: University of California, San Francisco
- Doctoral advisor: Alan Schumitzky
- Other academic advisors: Violet B. Haas

Pamela Gail Coxson is an American applied mathematician specialized in disease modelling. She is retired as a specialist in the division of general and internal medicine at the University of California, San Francisco Center for Vulnerable Populations.

== Life ==
Coxson completed a Ph.D. in mathematics from University of Southern California. Her 1979 dissertation was titled On the equivalence between open loop and closed loop control laws for linear systems. Alan Schumitzky was her doctoral advisor.

In 1985, while working as a fellow at the Mary Ingraham Bunting Institute, Coxson initiated the Association for Women in Mathematics' Sonia Kovalevsky Math Day program for female high schoolers and their teachers. In 1986, Coxson was a visiting assistant professor of mathematics at Ohio State University. One of her mentors was Violet B. Haas, whom she met in 1983.

Coxson has worked in several areas of applied mathematics including mathematics in pharmacokinetics, catalytic cracking of oil, satellite image processing, and medical imaging. Formerly working as a specialist in the division of general and internal medicine at the University of California, San Francisco Center for Vulnerable Populations, she retired in 2018.
