= Equivalent latitude =

Lagrangian coordinate

In differential geometry, the equivalent latitude is a Lagrangian coordinate . It is often used in atmospheric science, particularly in the study of stratospheric dynamics. Each isoline in a map of equivalent latitude follows the flow velocity and encloses the same area as the latitude line of equivalent value, hence "equivalent latitude." Equivalent latitude is calculated from potential vorticity, from passive tracer simulations and from actual measurements of atmospheric tracers such as ozone.

== Calculation of equivalent latitude ==
The calculation of equivalent latitude involves creating a monotonic mapping between the values of equivalent latitude and the tracer it is based upon: higher values of the tracer map to higher values of equivalent latitude. A precise method is to assign a representative area to each of the tracer measurements, filling the entire globe. Thus, for a tracer field regularly gridded in longitude and latitude, grid points closer to the pole will take up a smaller area, in proportion to the cosine of the latitude. Now, rank all the tracer values then form the cumulative sum. The equivalent latitude from the area is given as:

$$\phi = \sin^{-1} \left ( \frac{A}{2 \pi R^2} -1 \right )$$

where A is the area enclosed to the South (A = 0 corresponds to the equivalent South Pole) and R is the radius of the Earth. This method generates a mapping that is as continuous as the data allows as opposed to binning which produces a coarse-grained mapping.
