= Conservation form =

Conservation form or Eulerian form refers to an arrangement of an equation or system of equations, usually representing a hyperbolic system, that emphasizes that a property represented is conserved, i.e. a type of continuity equation. The term is usually used in the context of continuum mechanics.

== General form ==
Equations in conservation form take the form
$$\frac{\partial \xi}{\partial t} + \boldsymbol \nabla \cdot \mathbf f(\xi) = 0$$
for any conserved quantity $\xi$, with a suitable function $\mathbf f$. An equation of this form can be transformed into an integral equation
$$\frac d{d t} \int_V \xi ~ dV = -\oint_{\partial V} \mathbf f(\xi) \cdot \hat{\mathbf{n}} ~ dS$$
using the divergence theorem. The integral equation states that the change rate of the integral of the quantity $\xi$ over an arbitrary control volume $V$ is given by the flux $\mathbf f(\xi)$ through the boundary of the control volume, with $\hat{\mathbf{n}}$ being the outer surface normal through the boundary. $\xi$ is neither produced nor consumed inside of $V$ and is hence conserved. A typical choice for $\mathbf f$ is $\mathbf f(\xi) = \xi \mathbf u$, with velocity $\mathbf u$, meaning that the quantity $\xi$ flows with a given velocity field.

The integral form of such equations is usually the physically more natural formulation, and the differential equation arises from differentiation. Since the integral equation can also have non-differentiable solutions, the equality of both formulations can break down in some cases, leading to weak solutions and severe numerical difficulties in simulations of such equations.

== Example ==
An example of a set of equations written in conservation form are the Euler equations of fluid flow:
$$\frac{\partial\rho}{\partial t} + \nabla\cdot(\rho\mathbf u) = 0$$
$$\frac{\partial\rho \mathbf u}{\partial t} + \nabla\cdot(\rho \mathbf u \otimes \mathbf u + p \mathbf I) = 0$$
$$\frac{\partial E}{\partial t} + \nabla\cdot(\mathbf u(E+p)) = 0$$

Each of these represents the conservation of mass, momentum and energy, respectively.

== See also ==
- Conservation law
- Lagrangian and Eulerian specification of the flow field
