= Scanning multichannel microwave radiometer =

The Scanning Multichannel Microwave Radiometer (SMMR) [pronounced simmer] was a five-frequency microwave radiometer flown on the Seasat and Nimbus 7 satellites. Both were launched in 1978, with the Seasat mission lasting less than six months until failure of the primary bus. The Nimbus 7 SMMR lasted from 25 October 1978 until 20 August 1987. It measured dual-polarized microwave radiances, at 6.63, 10.69, 18.0, 21.0, and 37.0 GHz, from the Earth's atmosphere and surface. Its primary legacy has been the creation of areal sea-ice climatologies for the Arctic and Antarctic.

The final few months of operation were considerably fortuitous as they allowed the calibration of the radiometers and their products with the first results from the SSMI.
