= Isotherm =

Isotherm may refer to:

- Isotherm (contour line) – a type of equal temperature at a given date or time on a geographic map
- Isotherm – in thermodynamics, a curve on a p-V diagram for an isothermal process
- Moisture sorption isotherm – a curve giving the functional relationship between humidity and equilibrium water content of a material for a constant temperature
- Sorption isotherm – a curve giving the functional relationship between adsorbate and adsorbent in a constant-temperature adsorption process
