= Lagrangian and Eulerian specification of the flow field =

Computational fluid dynamics tools

File:Lagrangian vs Eulerian

Eulerian perspective of fluid velocity versus Lagrangian depiction of strain.

In classical field theories, the Lagrangian specification of the flow field is a way of looking at fluid motion where the observer follows an individual fluid parcel as it moves through space and time. Plotting the position of an individual parcel through time gives the pathline of the parcel. This can be visualized as sitting in a boat and drifting down a river.

The Eulerian specification of the flow field is a way of looking at fluid motion that focuses on specific locations in the space through which the fluid flows as time passes. This can be visualized by sitting on the bank of a river and watching the water pass the fixed location.

The Lagrangian and Eulerian specifications of the flow field are sometimes loosely denoted as the Lagrangian and Eulerian frame of reference. However, in general both the Lagrangian and Eulerian specification of the flow field can be applied in any observer's frame of reference, and in any coordinate system used within the chosen frame of reference. The Lagrangian and Eulerian specifications are named after Joseph-Louis Lagrange and Leonhard Euler, respectively.

These specifications are reflected in computational fluid dynamics, where "Eulerian" simulations employ a fixed mesh while "Lagrangian" ones (such as meshfree simulations) feature simulation nodes that may move following the velocity field.

== History ==
Leonhard Euler is credited with introducing both specifications in two publications written in 1755 and 1759. Joseph-Louis Lagrange studied the equations of motion in connection to the principle of least action in 1760, later in a treaty of fluid mechanics in 1781, and thirdly in his book Mécanique analytique. In this book Lagrange starts with the Lagrangian specification but later converts them into the Eulerian specification.

== Description ==
In the Eulerian specification of a field, the field is represented as a function of position x and time t. For example, the flow velocity is represented by a function
$$\mathbf{u}\left(\mathbf{x}, t\right).$$

This formalism is widely used in atmospheric science, ocean modeling, and geophysical fluid dynamics, where large‐scale flows are best described as fields that evolve over fixed points in space.

On the other hand, in the Lagrangian specification, individual fluid parcels are followed through time. The fluid parcels are labelled by some (time-independent) vector field x_{0}. (Often, x_{0} is chosen to be the position of the center of mass of the parcels at some initial time t_{0}. It is chosen in this particular manner to account for the possible changes of the shape over time. Therefore, the center of mass is a good parameterization of the flow velocity u of the parcel.) In the Lagrangian description, the flow is described by a function
$$\mathbf{X}\left(\mathbf{x}_0,t\right),$$
giving the position of the particle labeled x_{0} at time t.

The two specifications are related as follows:
$$\mathbf{u}\left(\mathbf{X}(\mathbf{x}_0,t), t \right) = \frac{\partial \mathbf{X}}{\partial t} \left(\mathbf{x}_0,t \right),$$
because both sides describe the velocity of the particle labeled x_{0} at time t.

Within a chosen coordinate system, x_{0} and x are referred to as the Lagrangian coordinates and Eulerian coordinates of the flow respectively.

== Material derivative ==
The Lagrangian and Eulerian specifications of the kinematics and dynamics of the flow field are related by the material derivative (also called the Lagrangian derivative, convective derivative, substantial derivative, or particle derivative).

Suppose we have a flow field u, and we are also given a generic field with Eulerian specification F(x, t). Now one might ask about the total rate of change of F experienced by a specific flow parcel. This can be computed as
$$\frac{\mathrm{D}\mathbf{F}}{\mathrm{D}t} = \frac{\partial \mathbf{F}}{\partial t} + \left(\mathbf{u}\cdot \nabla \right) \mathbf{F},$$
where ∇ denotes the nabla operator with respect to x, and the operator u⋅∇ is to be applied to each component of F. This tells us that the total rate of change of the function F as the fluid parcels moves through a flow field described by its Eulerian specification u is equal to the sum of the local rate of change and the convective rate of change of F. This is a consequence of the chain rule since we are differentiating the function F(X(x_{0}, t), t) with respect to t.

Conservation laws for a unit mass have a Lagrangian form, which together with mass conservation produce Eulerian conservation; on the contrary, when fluid particles can exchange a quantity (like energy or momentum), only Eulerian conservation laws exist.

== See also ==
- Brewer-Dobson Circulation
- Conservation form
- Contour advection
- Displacement field (mechanics)
- Equivalent latitude
- Generalized Lagrangian mean
- Trajectory (fluid mechanics)
- Liouville's theorem (Hamiltonian)
- Lagrangian particle tracking
- Rolling
- Streamlines, streaklines, and pathlines
- Immersed Boundary Method
- Semi-Lagrangian scheme
- Stochastic Eulerian Lagrangian methods
