= Isobar =

Isobar may refer to:

- Isobar (meteorology), a line on a map or chart connecting points of equal atmospheric pressure reduced to sea level.
- Isobaric process, a process taking place at constant pressure
- Isobar (nuclide), one of multiple nuclides with the same mass but with different numbers of protons (or, equivalently, different numbers of neutrons).

== See also ==
- Isosurface
