= Special sensor microwave/imager =

The Special Sensor Microwave/Imager (SSM/I) is a seven-channel, four-frequency, linearly polarized passive microwave radiometer system. It is flown on board the United States Air Force Defense Meteorological Satellite Program (DMSP) Block 5D-2 satellites. The instrument measures surface/atmospheric microwave brightness temperatures (TBs) at 19.35, 22.235, 37.0 and 85.5 GHz. The four frequencies are sampled in both horizontal and vertical polarizations, except the 22 GHz which is sampled in the vertical only.

The SSM/I has been a very successful instrument, superseding the across-track and Dicke radiometer designs of previous systems. Its combination of constant-angle rotary-scanning and total power radiometer design has become standard for passive microwave imagers, e.g. TRMM Microwave Imager, AMSR.

Its predecessor, the Scanning Multichannel Microwave Radiometer (SMMR), provided similar information. Its successor, the Special Sensor Microwave Imager / Sounder (SSMIS), is an enhanced eleven-channel, eight-frequency system.

== Products ==
Along with its predecessor SMMR, the SSM/I contributes to an archive of global passive microwave products from late 1978 to present.

Information within the SSM/I TBs measurements allow the retrieval of four important meteorological parameters over the ocean: near-surface wind speed (note scalar not vector), total columnar water vapor, total columnar cloud liquid water (liquid water path) and precipitation. Accurate and quantitative measurement of these parameters from the SSM/I TBs is, however, a non-trivial task. Variations within the meteorological parameters significantly modify the TBs. As well as open ocean retrievals, it is also possible to retrieve quantitatively reliable information on sea ice, land snow cover and over-land precipitation.

== Instrument characteristics ==
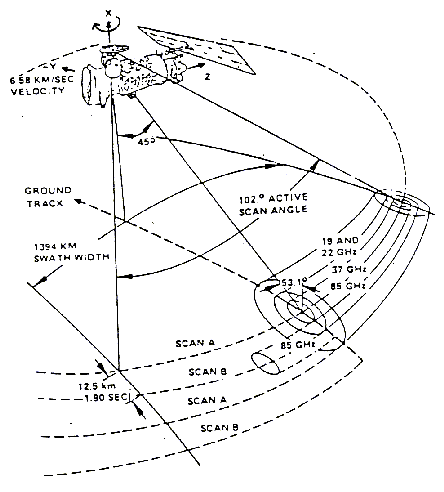
The scan geometry of the SSM/I

The Block 5D-2 satellites are in circular or near-circular Sun-synchronous and near-polar orbits at altitudes of 833 km with inclinations of 98.8° and orbital periods of 102.0 minutes, each making 14.1 full orbits per day. The scan direction is from the left to the right with the active scene measurements lying ± 51.2 degrees about when looking in the F8 forward (F10–F15) or aft (F8) direction of the spacecraft travel. This results in a nominal swath width of 1394 km allowing frequent ground coverage, especially at higher latitudes. All parts of the globe at latitudes greater than 58° are covered at least twice daily except for small unmeasured circular sectors of 2.4° about the poles. Extreme polar regions (> 72° N or S) receive coverage from two or more overpasses from both the ascending and descending orbits each day.

The spin rate of the SSM/I provides a period of 1.9 sec during which the DMSP spacecraft sub-satellite point travels 12.5 km. Each scan 128 discrete, uniformly spaced radiometric samples are taken at the two 85 GHz channels and, on alternate scans, 64 discrete samples are taken at the remaining 5 lower frequency channels. The resolution is determined by the Nyquist limit and the Earth surface's contribution of 3 dB bandwidth of the signal at a given frequency (see Table). The radiometer direction intersects the Earth's surface at a nominal incidence angle of 53.1 degrees, as measured from the local Earth normal.

Radiometric characteristics of the SSM/I.
Frequency (GHz)	Polarization	Along-track resolution (km)	Cross-track resolution (km)	Spatial sampling (km)	Instrument noise (K)
19.35	horizontal	69	43	25	0.42
19.35	vertical	69	43	25	0.45
22.235	vertical	50	40	25	0.74
37.0	horizontal	37	28	25	0.38
37.0	vertical	37	28	25	0.37
85.5	horizontal	15	13	12.5	0.73
85.5	vertical	15	13	12.5	0.69

== Instrument history ==
The SMMR was flown on Seasat and NASA Nimbus 7 in 1978. Seasat operated only for a few months until the satellite suffered an electrical short that ended the mission, while Nimbus 7 unexpectedly operated for 9 years, returning data until 1987.

The SSM/I has been operating almost continuously on Block 5D-2 flights F8-F15 (not F9) since June 1987. Concerns about the radiometer's performance over the full range of space environmental conditions led to the F8 instrument being switched off in early December 1987 to avoid overheating. The 85 GHz vertical polarization channel failed to switch on in January 1988. Analysis showed inadequate thermal shielding of the sensor's radiometers due to excessive heating at perihelion. The 85 GHz horizontal polarization subsequently had a large increase in radiometric errors and was switched off in summer 1988.

The launch of the next SSM/I, on board the F10 satellite, took place on 1 December 1990, but was not fully successful. The explosion of the booster rocket left the F10 in an elliptical orbit. The incidence angle of the F10 SSM/I boresight would vary in relation to the Earth throughout each orbit and this also altered the surface area of the Earth viewed by the radiometer. The deviations in the incidence angle of up to 1.4° were quite large and would alter the responses of several geophysical algorithms if not taken into consideration. Further, related changes in the swath width from a minimum of 1226 km at perigee to 1427 km at apogee altered the amounts of radiation viewed by the F10 SSM/I radiometers. The non-circular orbit also caused slight precession of the equatorial crossing time of the F10 by 50 seconds per week.

The F12 imager had a delayed launch date (the spacecraft was out of the DMSP build sequence) due to a faulty SSM/I. The extra time and costs taken to rectify the problem did not, however, help. The SSM/I failed to ‘spin-up’ after launch, and consequently data were not available from this instrument. The SSM/Is on F11, F13, F14 and F15 have all produced excellent data.

Before the F8 was decommissioned, it aided investigations into measuring passive microwaves at higher Earth incidence angles (i.e. > 51 degrees). An increase in angle would allow a greater swath width to be utilised, giving a greater amount of coverage at the Earth's surface. The F8 Tilt Experiment (see links) was carried out between 25 June and 13 July 1993.

SSM/I Satellites characteristics (source: DMSP website and http://www.ssmi.com).
Satellite	Ascending equatorial time at launch	Ascending equatorial time (1995)	Ascending equatorial time (current)	Descending equatorial time (current)	Launch date	End mission/operational support
F8	6h15	6h17	N/A	N/A (should be 18h17)	1987-06-18	1991-08-13
F10	19h42	22h09	N/A	N/A (should be 10h09)	1990-12-01	1997/11
F11	17h00	18h25	19h38	7h25 (should be 7h25)	1991-11-28	2000/08
F13	17h42	17h43	18h33	6h33	1995-03-24	Providing primary support
F14	20h21	N/A	19h08	7h08	1997/05	2008-8-23
F15	21h31	N/A	20h42	8h42	1999-12-12	2021-08-09
F16 (carries new sensor SSMIS)	21h05	N/A	21h05	9h05	2003-10-18	N/A to research community

F17, F18, and F19 all carry SSMIS.
