= Coriolis (satellite) =

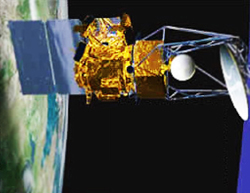
- Mission type: Earth and Solar observation
- Operator: NRL, AFRL
- COSPAR ID: 2003-001A
- SATCAT no.: 27640
- Mission duration: 22 years, 3 months and 9 days (elasped)

Spacecraft properties
- Manufacturer: Spectrum Astro Inc
- Launch mass: 395 kilograms (871 lb)
- Power: 1,174 watts

Start of mission
- Launch date: January 6, 2003, 14:19 UTC
- Rocket: Titan II(23)G
- Launch site: Vandenberg SLC-4W

Orbital parameters
- Reference system: Geocentric
- Regime: Low Earth
- Eccentricity: 0.0013721
- Perigee altitude: 826 kilometers (513 mi)
- Apogee altitude: 846 kilometers (526 mi)
- Inclination: 98.7 degrees
- Period: 101.5 minutes
- Epoch: 14 November 2016, 20:52:53 UTC

Instruments
- WindSat, SMEI

The Coriolis satellite is a Naval Research Laboratory (NRL) and Air Force Research Laboratory (AFRL) Earth and space observation satellite launched from Vandenberg Air Force Base, on January 6, 2003, at 14:19 GMT.

== Instruments ==
=== WINDSAT ===
WINDSAT is a joint Integrated Program Office/Department of Defense demonstration project, intended to measure ocean surface wind speed and wind direction from space using a polarimetric radiometer. WINDSAT was developed and managed by the Space Test Program at Kirtland AFB in New Mexico, designed for a three-year lifetime. It is primarily designed to measure ocean surface wind direction (nonprecipitating conditions) with a 25-km spatial resolution. Secondary measurements are Sea surface temperature, soil moisture, rain rate, ice and snow characteristics and water vapor.

=== Solar Mass Ejection Imager (SMEI) ===
The Solar Mass Ejection Imager (SMEI) is an instrument intended to detect disturbances in the solar wind by means of imaging scattered light from the free electrons in the plasma of the solar wind. To do this three CCD cameras observe sections of the sky of size 60 by 3 degree.

As the SMEI instrument observes the whole sky, data generated has been used to observe periodic changes in the brightness of stars. This data can be used to detect asteroseismological oscillation in giant stars, and for the detection of large eclipsing extra-solar planets.

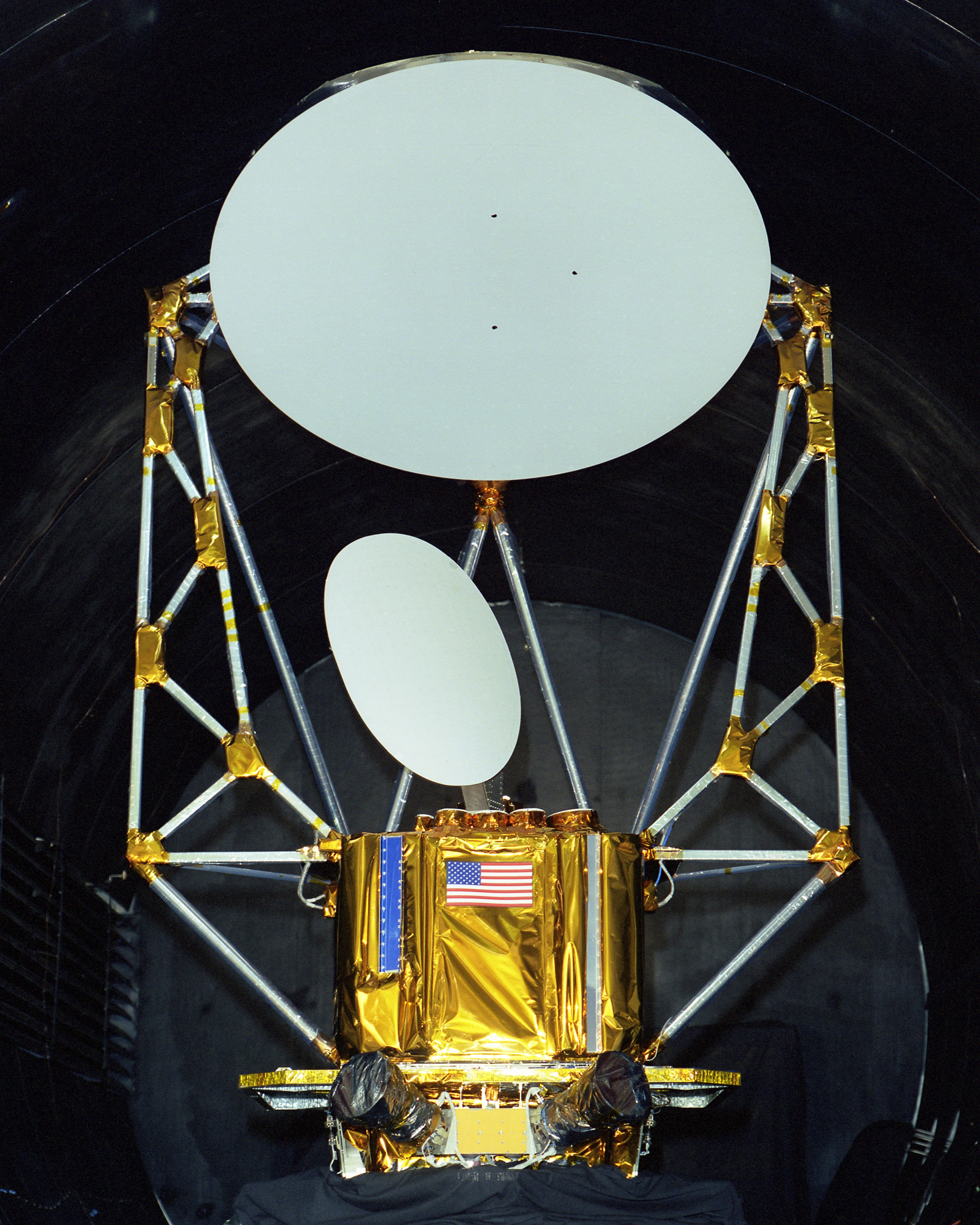
Image of the Windsat component undergoing testing

== Bibliography ==
- WINDSAT Project Information
- WINDSAT Contractors Web Site
- WINDSAT site at NRL
- WINDSAT site at ONR
- Launch Schedule for ITC
