= Comparison gallery of image scaling algorithms =

Visual examples of techniques for image scaling

This gallery shows the results of numerous image scaling algorithms.

== Upscaling methods ==
An image size can be changed in several ways. Consider resizing a 160x160 pixel photo to the following 40x40 pixel thumbnail and then upscaling the thumbnail to a 160x160 pixel image. Also consider doubling the size of the following image containing text.

Low-resolution images
Thumbnail	Text
Thumbnail Image	Original Image 40x40 pixel thumbnail

Comparison of upscaling methods
Original photo	Upscaled thumbnail	Upscaled text	Algorithm and description
160×160 thumbnail reference	Nearest-neighbor interpolation	Nearest-neighbor interpolation	=== Nearest-neighbor interpolation === One of the simpler ways of increasing the size, replacing every pixel with a number of pixels of the same color. The resulting image is larger than the original, and preserves all the original detail, but has (possibly undesirable) jaggedness. The diagonal lines of the "W", for example, now show the "stairway" shape characteristic of nearest-neighbor interpolation. Other scaling methods below are better at preserving smooth contours in the image.
160×160 thumbnail reference	Bilinear interpolation	Linear Interpolation	=== Bilinear interpolation === Linear (or bilinear, in two dimensions) interpolation is typically good for changing the size of an image, but causes some undesirable softening of details and can still be somewhat jagged.
160×160 thumbnail reference	Bicubic Interpolation	Cubic Interpolation	=== Bicubic interpolation === Better scaling methods include Lanczos resampling and Mitchell-Netravali filters.
160×160 thumbnail reference	Fourier-based interpolation	Fourier-based Interpolation + saturation	=== Fourier-based interpolation === Simple Fourier based interpolation based on padding of the frequency domain with zero components (a smooth-window-based approach would reduce the ringing). Beside the good conservation of details, notable is the ringing and the circular bleeding of content from the left border to right border (and way around).
160×160 thumbnail reference			=== Edge-directed interpolation === Edge-directed interpolation algorithms aim to preserve edges in the image after scaling, unlike other algorithms which can produce staircase artifacts around diagonal lines or curves. Examples of algorithms for this task include: New Edge-Directed Interpolation (NEDI).; Edge-Guided Image Interpolation (EGGI).; Iterative Curvature-Based Interpolation (ICBI).; Directional Cubic Convolution Interpolation (DCCI), which was found to have the best scores in PSNR and SSIM on a series of test images in 2013.
160×160 thumbnail reference	hq4x scaling	hq2x scaling	=== Pixel art scaling algorithms (hqx) === For magnifying computer graphics with low resolution and few colors (usually from 2 to 256 colors), better results will be achieved by pixel art scaling algorithms such as hqx or xbr. These produce sharp edges and maintain high level of detail. Unfortunately due to the standardized size of 218x80 pixels, the "Wiki" image cannot use HQ4x or 4xBRZ to better demonstrate the artifacts they may produce such as row shifting. The example images use HQ4x and HQ2x respectively.
160×160 thumbnail reference	160 by 160 upscaled thumbnail of 'Green Sea Shell' (4xBRZ)	Image after scaling (2xBRZ)	=== Pixel art scaling algorithms (xbr) === The xbr family is very useful for creating smooth edges. It will however deform the shape significantly, which in many cases creates a very appealing result. However it will create an effect similar to posterization by grouping together local areas into a single colour. It will also remove small details if in-between larger ones which connect together. The example images use 4xBRZ and 2xBRZ respectively.
160×160 thumbnail reference	160 by 160 upscaled thumbnail of 'Green Sea Shell' (GemCutter Preserve Details) 160 by 160 upscaled thumbnail of 'Green Sea Shell' (Smooth Edges)	Image after scaling (GemCutter Preserve Details) Image-after-scaling smooth	=== Pixel art scaling algorithms (GemCutter) === An adaptable technique which can deliver variable amounts of detail or smoothness. It aims to preserve the shape and coordinates of original details, without blurring those details into neighboring ones. It will avoid blending pixels which directly touch each other, and instead only blend pixels with their diagonal neighbors. The "Cutter" name comes from its tendency to cut corners of squares and turn them into diamonds, as well as create distinct faces along stair-stepped pixels, i.e. those which exist on along the angles of edges found on a diamond. The "Gem" prefix both refers to the diamond cut, and also many traditional gem cuts which involve cutting corners at a 45-degree angle. The example images use GemCutter Preserve Details (Top), and GemCutter Smooth Edges (Bottom).
160×160 thumbnail reference	Vectorization to 48 colors (Inkscape)	Vectorization	=== Image tracing === Vectorization first creates a resolution-independent vector representation of the graphic to be scaled. Then the resolution-independent version is rendered as a raster image at the desired resolution. This technique is used by Adobe Illustrator Live Trace, Inkscape, and several recent papers. Scalable Vector Graphics are well suited to simple geometric images, while photographs do not fare well with vectorization due to their complexity. Note that the special characteristics of vectors allow for greater resolution example images. The other algorithms are standardized to a resolution of 160x160 and 218x80 pixels respectively.
160×160 thumbnail reference	EDSR	waifu2x (unknown version?)	=== Deep convolutional neural networks === Using machine learning, convincing details are generated as best guesses by learning common patterns from a training data set. The upscaled result is sometimes described as a hallucination because the information introduced may not correspond to the content of the source. Enhanced deep residual network (EDSR) methods have been developed by optimizing conventional residual neural network architecture. Programs that use this method include waifu2x, Imglarger and Neural Enhance.
160×160 thumbnail reference	ESRGAN	RealESRGAN-x4plus TTA	=== Deep convolutional neural networks using perceptual loss === Developed on the basis of the super-resolution generative adversarial network (SRGAN) method, enhanced SRGAN (ESRGAN) is an incremental tweaking of the same generative adversarial network basis. Both methods rely on a perceptual loss function to evaluate training iterations.

== Examples of enlarged images ==
Below are examples of various images enlarged 4x using each scaling algorithm.

Examples of various images enlarged 4x
Scaling algorithm	Portrait photo (Note: https://dome.mit.edu/handle/1721.3/195767 enlarged 4x, cropped at x:420, y:210, w:170, h:200)	Text (Note: File:Image-before-scaling.png outer perimeter 2px, tone -25%, enlarged 4x, cropped at x:75, y:0, w:170, h:192)	Pixel art (Note: File:Pixelart-tv-iso.png enlargemed 4x, cropped at x:25, y:15, w:170, h:200)	Anime art (Note: File:Wikipe-tan face.svg 128px PNG file, enlarged 4x, cropped at x:110,y:80,w:170,h:200)
Nearest-neighbor interpolation				
Bilinear interpolation				
Bicubic interpolation ($a=-0.5$)				
Lanczos resampling				
Deep convolutional neural networks using perceptual loss（Real-ESRGAN (Note: https://github.com/xinntao/Real-ESRGAN model: realesrgan-x4plus for portrait photo, realesrgan-x4plus-anime for others)）				

== Downscaling methods ==
Consider resizing a 600×600 pixel image to 150×150.

Comparison of downscaling methods
Original photo (Note: Resized by the web browser own algorithm, open it for the full size original image.)	Downscaled	Algorithm and description
		=== Nearest-neighbor interpolation ===
		=== Bilinear interpolation ===
		=== Bicubic interpolation ===
		=== Lanczos interpolation ===
