= Mitchell–Netravali filters =

Filter in digital signal processing

The Mitchell–Netravali filters or BC-splines are a group of reconstruction filters used primarily in computer graphics, which can be used, for example, for anti-aliasing or for scaling raster graphics. They are also known as bicubic filters in image editing programs because they are bi-dimensional cubic splines.

== Definition ==
Graph of the Mitchell–Netravali filter with parameters B = C = 1/3

The Mitchell–Netravali filters were designed as part of an investigation into artifacts from reconstruction filters. The filters are piece-wise cubic filters with four-pixel wide supports. After excluding unsuitable filters from this family, such as discontinuous curves, two parameters $B$ and $C$ remain, through which the Mitchell–Netravali filters can be configured. The filters are defined as follows:

$$k(x) = \frac{1}{6}
\begin{cases}
\begin{array}{l}
(12-9B-6C)|x|^3 + (-18+12B+6C)|x|^2 \\
\qquad + (6-2B)
\end{array} & \text{, if } |x|<1 \\
\begin{array}{l}
(-B-6C)|x|^3 + (6B+30C)|x|^2 \\
\qquad + (-12B-48C)|x| + (8B+24C)
\end{array} & \text{, if } 1\le |x|<2 \\
0 & \text{otherwise}
\end{cases}$$

It is possible to construct two-dimensional versions of the Mitchell–Netravali filters by separation. In this case the filters can be replaced by a series of interpolations with the one-dimensional filter. From the color values of the four neighboring pixels $P_0$, $P_1$, $P_2$, $P_3$ the color value is then calculated $P(d)$ as follows:

$$\begin{align}
P(d) &\textstyle = \left((-\frac{1}{6}B-C)P_0 + (-\frac{3}{2}B-C+2)P_1 + (\frac{3}{2}B+C-2)P_2 + (\frac{1}{6}B+C)P_3\right) d^3 \\
&\textstyle + \left((\frac{1}{2}B+2C)P_0 + (2B+C-3)P_1 + (-\frac{5}{2}B-2C+3)P_2 -CP_3\right) d^2 \\
&\textstyle + \left((-\frac{1}{2}B-C)P_0 + (\frac{1}{2}B+C)P_2\right) d \\
&\textstyle + \frac{1}{6}BP_0 + (-\frac{1}{3}B+1)P_1 + \frac{1}{6}BP_2 \\
\end{align}$$

$P$ lies between $P_1$ and $P_2$; $d$ is the distance between $P_1$ and $P$.

== Subjective effects ==
Various artifacts may result from certain choices of parameters B and C, as shown in the following illustration. The researchers recommended values from the family $B+2C=1$ (dashed line) and especially $\textstyle B=C=\frac{1}{3}$ as a satisfactory compromise.

Subjective appearance of images reconstructed with various Mitchell–Netravali filters.

== Implementations ==
The following parameters result in well-known cubic splines used in common image editing programs:

B	C	Cubic spline	Common implementations
0	Any	Cardinal splines	
0	0.5	Catmull-Rom spline	
0	0.75	Unnamed	Bicubic filter in Adobe Photoshop
1/3	1/3	Mitchell–Netravali	Mitchell filter in ImageMagick
1	0	B-spline	Bicubic filter in Paint.net

== Examples ==
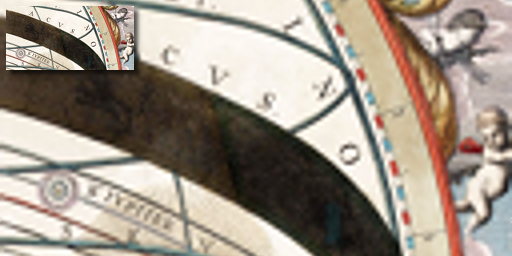
Magnification with a bicubic filter in an early version of GIMP (which at the time used Catmull-Rom)

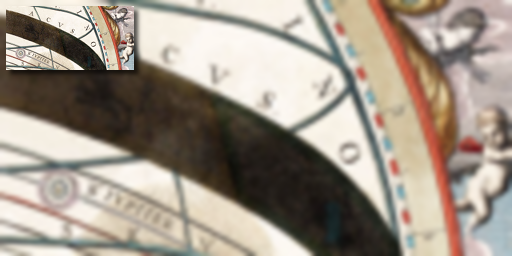
Magnification with a bicubic filter in Paint.NET (B-spline)

== See also ==
- Ringing artifacts
- Anisotropic filtering
- Kernel (image processing)
