= DCCI =

DCCI may refer to:

- 701 (number), written as a Roman numeral
- DCCI Tower, a building in Dhaka, Bangladesh
- Defense Cyber Crime Institute, a division of the United States Department of Defense
- Dhaka Chamber of Commerce & Industry, an organization for businessmen in Bangladesh
- Directional Cubic Convolution Interpolation, an image scaling algorithm
- N,N′-Dicyclohexylcarbodiimide, a chemical compound
