= Waifu2x =

Image scaling algorithm

waifu2x
- Original author: nagadomi
- Initial release: October 11, 2015; 10 years ago
- Stable release: v0.13.2 / November 18, 2018; 7 years ago
- Repository: github.com/nagadomi/waifu2x
- Written in: Lua
- Operating system: Linux with CUDA support
- License: MIT License
- Website: www.waifu2x.net

waifu2x is an image scaling and noise reduction program for anime-style art and other types of photos.

waifu2x was inspired by Super-Resolution Convolutional Neural Network (SRCNN). It uses Nvidia's CUDA for computing, although alternative implementations that allow for OpenCL and Vulkan have been created.

== Etymology ==
Waifu (from the Japanese pronunciation of "wife") is anime slang for a female character to whom one is attracted. 2x means two-times magnification.

== Example ==
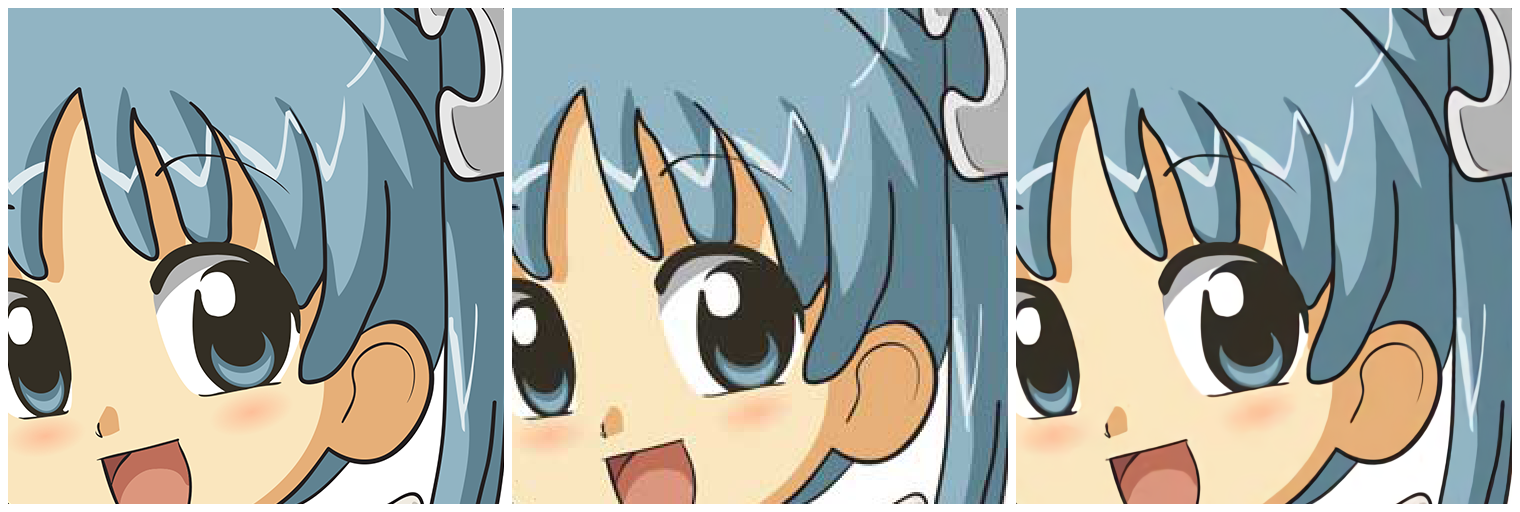
- Left: 512×512px, PNG lossless, original source Wikipe-tan face.svg
- Middle: 256×256px, JPG quality 30%, then nearest-neighbor interpolation
- Right: 512×512px, waifu2x upscaling & noise reduction

== See also ==
- Comparison gallery of image scaling algorithms
