= Guy Nason =

British mathematician

Guy P. Nason
- Born: 28 August 1966 (age 60)
- Education: University of Bath; University of Cambridge
- Scientific career
- Fields: Statistics
- Workplaces: University of Bristol; Imperial College London
- Doctoral advisor: Robin Sibson

Guy Philip Nason (born 28 August 1966) is a British statistician, and professor of Statistics at Imperial College London.

Nason received his BSc from the University of Bath in 1988, a diploma in Mathematical Statistics from the University of Cambridge in 1989, and a PhD in Statistics from the University of Bath in 1992. He served as a Council member of the Royal Statistical Society (2004–08), and was Vice-President (Academic Affairs) 2016–2020. He is a member of the EPSRC Strategic Advisory Team for Mathematics. He was an EPSRC Advanced Research Fellow during 2000–5 and was awarded the Guy Medal in bronze by the Royal Statistical Society (RSS) in 2001. He took over the post as head of mathematics at Bristol from Stephen Wiggins in 2008.

Nason is best known for his work in the area of time series analysis, especially wavelet approaches. He has served as the Secretary of the RSS Research Section (2002–04), associate editor for the Journal of the RSS, Series B, Computational Statistics and Statistica Sinica and is currently an associate editor for Biometrika.
