= Robin Sibson =

British mathematician (1944–2017)

- Born: 4 May 1944
- Died: 19 March 2017 (aged 72)
- Education: University of Cambridge
- Known for: Natural neighbour interpolation
- Scientific career
- Fields: Statistics
- Workplaces: University of Bath
- Doctoral advisor: David George Kendall
- Doctoral students: Guy Nason

Robin Sibson (4 May 1944 – 19 March 2017) was a British mathematician and educator.

He was a fellow of King's College, Cambridge, professor of statistics at the University of Bath and then vice-chancellor of the University of Kent. He was chief executive of the Higher Education Statistics Agency from 2001 until 2009. He was also a member of the Committee for Higher Education and Research (CC-HER), the predecessor to the Steering Committee for Higher Education and Research (CDESR).

He died on 19 March 2017 at the age of 72.

== Research ==
He was the developer of natural neighbour interpolation on discrete sets of points in space.

== Selected bibliography ==
=== Books ===
- Sibson, Robin; Jardine, Nicholas (1971). Mathematical taxonomy. London, New York: Wiley. ISBN 9780471440505.

=== Chapter in books ===
- Sibson, Robin (1981), "A brief description of natural neighbour interpolation", in Barnett, Vic (ed.), Interpreting multivariate data, Chichester West Sussex New York: Wiley, pp. 21–35, ISBN 9780471280392
