= Directional cubic convolution interpolation =

Directional cubic convolution interpolation (DCCI) is an edge-directed image scaling algorithm created by Dengwen Zhou and Xiaoliu Shen.

By taking into account the edges in an image, this scaling algorithm reduces artifacts common to other image scaling algorithms. For example, staircase artifacts on diagonal lines and curves are eliminated.

The algorithm resizes an image to 2x its original dimensions, minus 1.

== See also ==
- Image scaling
- Bilinear interpolation
- Bicubic interpolation
- Spline interpolation
- Lanczos resampling
- Comparison gallery of image scaling algorithms
