= Natural-neighbor interpolation =

Method of spatial interpolation

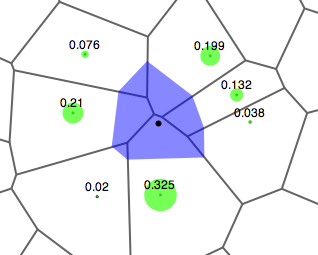
Natural neighbor interpolation with Sibson weights. The area of the green circles are the interpolating weights, w_{i}. The purple-shaded region is the new Voronoi cell, after inserting the point to be interpolated (black dot). The weights represent the intersection areas of the purple-cell with each of the seven surrounding cells.

Natural-neighbor interpolation or Sibson interpolation is a method of spatial interpolation, developed by Robin Sibson. The method is based on Voronoi tessellation of a discrete set of spatial points. This has advantages over simpler methods of interpolation, such as nearest-neighbor interpolation, in that it provides a smoother approximation to the underlying "true" function.

== Formulation ==
The basic equation is:

$$G(x)=\sum^n_{i=1}{w_i(x)f(x_i)}$$

where $G(x)$ is the estimate at $x$, $w_i$ are the weights and $f(x_i)$ are the known data at $(x_i)$. The weights, $w_i$, are calculated by finding how much of each of the surrounding areas is "stolen" when inserting $x$ into the tessellation.

Sibson weights
$$w_i(\mathbf{x})=\frac{A(\mathbf{x}_i)}{A(\mathbf{x})}$$

where A(x) is the volume of the new cell centered in x, and A(x_{i}) is the volume of the intersection between the new cell centered in x and the old cell centered in x_{i}.

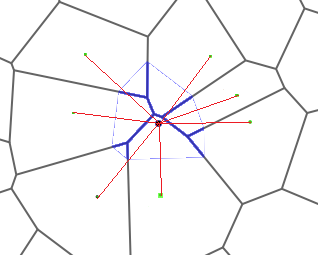
Natural neighbor interpolation with Laplace weights. The interface l(x_{i}) between the cells linked to x and x_{i} is in blue, while the distance d(x_{i}) between x and x_{i} is in red.

Laplace weights
$$w_i(\mathbf{x})=\frac{\frac{l(\mathbf{x}_i)}{d(\mathbf{x}_i)}}{\sum_{k=1}^n \frac{l(\mathbf{x}_k)}{d(\mathbf{x}_k)}}$$

where l(x_{i}) is the measure of the interface between the cells linked to x and x_{i} in the Voronoi diagram (length in 2D, surface in 3D) and d(x_{i}), the distance between x and x_{i}.

== Properties ==
There are several useful properties of natural neighbor interpolation:

1. The method is an exact interpolator, in that the original data values are retained at the reference data points.
2. The method creates a smooth surface free from any discontinuities.
3. The method is entirely local, as it is based on a minimal subset of data locations that excludes locations that, while close, are more distant than another location in a similar direction.
4. The method is spatially adaptive, automatically adapting to local variation in data density or spatial arrangement.
5. There is no requirement to make statistical assumptions.
6. The method can be applied to very small datasets as it is not statistically based.
7. The method is parameter free, so no input parameters that will affect the success of the interpolation need to be specified.

== Extensions ==
Natural neighbor interpolation has also been implemented in a discrete form, which has been demonstrated to be computationally more efficient in at least some circumstances. A form of discrete natural neighbor interpolation has also been developed that gives a measure of interpolation uncertainty.

== See also ==
- Inverse distance weighting
- Multivariate interpolation
