= Discrete spline interpolation =

In the mathematical field of numerical analysis, discrete spline interpolation is a form of interpolation where the interpolant is a special type of piecewise polynomial called a discrete spline. A discrete spline is a piecewise polynomial such that its central differences are continuous at the knots whereas a spline is a piecewise polynomial such that its derivatives are continuous at the knots. Discrete cubic splines are discrete splines where the central differences of orders 0, 1, and 2 are required to be continuous.

Discrete splines were introduced by Mangasarin and Schumaker in 1971 as solutions of certain minimization problems involving differences.

== Discrete cubic splines ==
Let x_{1}, x_{2}, . . ., x_{n-1} be an increasing sequence of real numbers. Let g(x) be a piecewise polynomial defined by

$$g(x)=
\begin{cases}
g_1(x) & x<x_1 \\
g_i(x) & x_{i-1}\le x < x_i \text{ for } i = 2,3, \ldots, n-1\\
g_n(x) & x\ge x_{n-1}
\end{cases}$$

where g_{1}(x), . . ., g_{n}(x) are polynomials of degree 3. Let h > 0. If

$$(g_{i+1}-g_i)(x_i +jh)=0 \text{ for } j=-1,0,1 \text{ and } i=1,2,\ldots, n-1$$

then g(x) is called a discrete cubic spline.

=== Alternative formulation 1 ===
The conditions defining a discrete cubic spline are equivalent to the following:

$$g_{i+1}(x_i-h) = g_i(x_i-h)$$

$$g_{i+1}(x_i) = g_i(x_i)$$

$$g_{i+1}(x_i+h) = g_i(x_i+h)$$

=== Alternative formulation 2 ===
The central differences of orders 0, 1, and 2 of a function f(x) are defined as follows:

$$D^{(0)}f(x) = f(x)$$

$$D^{(1)}f(x)=\frac{f(x+h)-f(x-h)}{2h}$$

$$D^{(2)}f(x)=\frac{f(x+h)-2f(x)+f(x-h)}{h^2}$$

The conditions defining a discrete cubic spline are also equivalent to

$$D^{(j)}g_{i+1}(x_i)=D^{(j)}g_i(x_i) \text{ for } j=0,1,2 \text{ and } i=1,2, \ldots, n-1.$$

This states that the central differences $D^{(j)}g(x)$ are continuous at x_{i}.

=== Example ===
Let x_{1} = 1 and x_{2} = 2 so that n = 3. The following function defines a discrete cubic spline:

$$g(x) =
\begin{cases}
x^3 & x<1 \\
x^3 - 2(x-1)((x-1)^2-h^2) & 1\le x < 2\\
x^3 - 2(x-1)((x-1)^2-h^2)+(x-2)((x-2)^2-h^2) & x \ge 2
\end{cases}$$

== Discrete cubic spline interpolant ==
Let x_{0} < x_{1} and x_{n} > x_{n-1} and f(x) be a function defined in the closed interval [x_{0} - h, x_{n} + h]. Then there is a unique cubic discrete spline g(x) satisfying the following conditions:

$$g(x_i) = f(x_i) \text{ for } i=0,1,\ldots, n.$$
$$D^{(1)}g_1(x_0) = D^{(1)}f(x_0).$$
$$D^{(1)}g_n(x_n) = D^{(1)}f(x_n).$$

This unique discrete cubic spline is the discrete spline interpolant to f(x) in the interval [x_{0} - h, x_{n} + h]. This interpolant agrees with the values of f(x) at x_{0}, x_{1}, . . ., x_{n}.

== Applications ==
- Discrete cubic splines were originally introduced as solutions of certain minimization problems.
- They have applications in computing nonlinear splines.
- They are used to obtain approximate solution of a second order boundary value problem.
- Discrete interpolatory splines have been used to construct biorthogonal wavelets.
