= Anti-aliasing =

Anti-aliasing includes several techniques in computer graphics and computer-generated imagery to combat the problems of aliasing in a sampled signal such as a digital image or digital audio recording.

Specific topics in anti-aliasing include:

- Anti-aliasing filter, a filter used before a signal sampler to restrict the bandwidth of a signal such as in audio applications.
- Manual anti-aliasing, an artistic technique done in pixel art graphics to smooth transitions between shapes, soften lines or blur edges.
- Spatial anti-aliasing, techniques for minimizing aliasing when representing a high-resolution images at a lower resolution:
  - Fast approximate anti-aliasing (FXAA), created by Timothy Lottes under Nvidia. Also known as Fast Sample Anti-aliasing (FSAA).
  - Multisample anti-aliasing (MSAA)
  - Super-sampling (SSAA)
  - Morphological antialiasing (MLAA)
  - Conservative morphological anti-aliasing (CMAA)
- Temporal anti-aliasing (TAA), which can refer to a spatial anti-aliasing that reuses old frames, or an effect similar to motion blur. Related techniques:
  - Deep learning anti-aliasing (DLAA), a type of spatial and temporal anti-aliasing method relying on dedicated tensor core processors.
  - Deep learning super sampling (DLSS), a family of real-time deep learning image enhancement and upscaling technologies.

== In cel animation ==
In cel animation, animators can either add motion lines or create an object trail to give the impression of movement. To solve the wagon-wheel effect without changing the sampling rate or wheel speed, animators could add a broken or discolored spoke to force viewer's visual system to make the correct connections between frames.

== See also ==
- Aliasing
- Pixel-art scaling algorithms
- Nyquist–Shannon sampling theorem
