= CMAA =

CMAA may refer to:

== Computer Graphics ==
- Conservative Morphological Anti-Aliasing, an AA technique that is almost as fast as FXAA (Fast Approximate Anti-Aliasing) but with much less blurring.

== Organizations ==
- California Museum of Ancient Art
- The Cambodian Mine Action and Victim Assistance Authority, concerned with the removal of land mines in Cambodia
- Church Music Association of America, the association of Catholic musicians
- Club Managers' Association Australia, an Australian trade union
- Club Managers Association of America, professional association for managers of membership clubs
- Comics Magazine Association of America, a United States organization to regulate the content of comic books
- Construction Management Association of America
- Country Music Association of Australia
- Crane Manufacturer's Association of America, a trade organization of leading electric overhead traveling crane manufacturers in the United States

== Music ==
- Country Music Awards of Australia
