= Filter (video) =

Software component for decoding video or audio

A video filter is a software component that performs some operation on a multimedia stream. Multiple filters can be used in a chain, known as a filter graph, in which each filter receives input from its upstream filter, processes the input and outputs the processed video to its downstream filter.

With regard to video encoding three categories of filters can be distinguished:

- prefilters: used before encoding
- intrafilters: used while encoding (and are thus an integral part of a video codec)
- postfilters: used after decoding

== Prefilters ==
Common prefilters include:

- denoising
- resizing (upsampling, downsampling)
- contrast enhancement
- deinterlacing (used to convert interlaced video to progressive video)
- deflicking

== Intrafilters ==
Common intrafilters include:

- deblocking

== Postfilters ==
Common postfilters include:

- deinterlacing
- deblocking
- deringing

== See also ==
- Filter graph
