= Deep Learning Super Sampling =

Image upscaling technology by Nvidia

- Developer: Nvidia
- Release: February 2019; 7 years ago
- Stable release: 5.0 / September 2026; 2 months ago
- Operating system: Microsoft Windows
- Platform: Nvidia RTX GPUs, Nintendo Switch 2
- Type: Image upscaling, anti-aliasing, frame generation
- License: Proprietary
- Website: nvidia.com/en-us/geforce/technologies/dlss/

Deep Learning Super Sampling (DLSS) is a suite of real-time deep learning image enhancement and upscaling technologies developed by Nvidia that are available in a number of video games. The goal of these technologies is to allow the majority of the graphics pipeline to run at a lower resolution for increased performance, and then infer a higher resolution image from this which approximates the same level of detail as if the image had been rendered at this higher resolution. This allows for higher graphical settings or frame rates for a given output resolution, depending on user preference.

All generations of DLSS are available on all RTX-branded cards from Nvidia in supported titles. However, the Frame Generation feature is officially supported only on RTX 40 series GPUs or newer and Multi Frame Generation is officially available only on 50 series GPUs. Third-party developers have demonstrated Nvidia's own DLSS Frame Generation runtime operating unofficially on RTX 30-series GPUs, including both 2× and Multi Frame Generation modes.

== History ==
Nvidia advertised DLSS as a key feature of GeForce RTX 20 series GPUs when they launched in September 2018. At that time, the results were limited to a few video games, namely Battlefield V, or Metro Exodus, because the algorithm had to be trained specifically on each game on which it was applied and the results were usually not as good as simple resolution upscaling. In 2019, Control shipped with ray tracing and an image processing algorithm that approximated DLSS, which did not use the Tensor Cores.

In April 2020, Nvidia advertised and shipped an improved version of DLSS named DLSS 2 with driver version 445.75. DLSS 2.0 was available for a few existing games including Control and Wolfenstein: Youngblood, and would later be added to many newly released games and game engines such as Unreal Engine and Unity. This time Nvidia said that it used the Tensor Cores again, and that the AI did not need to be trained specifically on each game. Despite sharing the DLSS branding, the two iterations of DLSS differ significantly and are not backwards-compatible.

In January 2025, Nvidia stated that there are over 540 games and apps supporting DLSS, and that over 80% of Nvidia RTX users activate DLSS. In March 2025, there were more than 100 games that support DLSS 4, according to Nvidia. By May 2025, over 125 games supported DLSS 4. The first video game console to use DLSS, the Nintendo Switch 2, was released on June 5, 2025.

Following the introduction of DLSS 4, Nvidia stated that its revised Frame Generation implementation no longer used the hardware Optical Flow Accelerator employed by the original DLSS 3 implementation, with optical-flow processing instead handled by an AI model running on Tensor Cores. When Digital Foundry asked Nvidia vice president of Applied Deep Learning Research Bryan Catanzaro what prevented the newer Frame Generation implementation from running on RTX 30-series GPUs, Catanzaro described it primarily as a question of optimization, engineering and the resulting user experience. Nvidia separately told PC Gamer that support for previous GPU architectures would require further optimization and testing.

Nvidia announced DLSS 4.5 at CES 2026. In January 2026, Nvidia stated that over 250 games and applications support Multi Frame Generation.

On March 16, 2026, at GTC 2026, Nvidia CEO Jensen Huang presented DLSS 5, a real-time AI model based on neural rendering that purports to realistically enhance lighting and material surfaces at up to 4K resolution while retaining the developer's intended art style. It is planned to release in fall of 2026. In a blog post on its website, Nvidia has announced that DLSS 5 will be available in such games as Assassin's Creed Shadows, Delta Force, Hogwarts Legacy, Naraka: Bladepoint, Phantom Blade Zero, Resident Evil Requiem, Starfield, The Elder Scrolls IV: Oblivion Remastered, and more. Originally planned as an exclusive feature for GeForce RTX 50-series GPUs, Nvidia spokesperson Rajal Maharaj told The Verge in September 2026 that the company will bring DLSS 5 to RTX 40-series GPUs as well at a later date.

On May 31, 2026, Nvidia announced an updated version of Ray Reconstruction for DLSS 4.5 in a blog post, scheduled for release on all RTX GPUs in August of the same year. They said it is designed to better embed spatial awareness into scenes and analyze engine data on movements and lighting conditions, resulting in a sharper, more stable, and less noisy image. It was released on August 25, 2026.

=== Release timeline ===
Release	Release date	Highlights
1.0	February 2019	Predominantly spatial image upscaler, required specific training for each game integration, included in Battlefield V and Metro Exodus, among others
"1.9" (unofficial name)	August 2019	DLSS 1.0 adapted for running on the CUDA shader cores instead of tensor cores, used for Control
2.0	April 2020	An AI-accelerated form of TAAU using Tensor Cores, and trained generically
3.0	September 2022	Augmented with an optical flow frame generation algorithm (only available on RTX 40-series GPUs) to generate frames in between rendered frames
3.5	September 2023	Ray Reconstruction, replacing multiple denoising algorithms with a single AI model trained on five times more data than DLSS 3
4.0	January 2025	Multi Frame Generation, new AI-model based on the transformer architecture, improving frame stability, reduced memory usage, and increased lighting detail
4.5	January 2026	Dynamic Frame Generation and improved transformer model
5.0	September 2026	AI model based on neural rendering, enhancing lighting and material surfaces

== Technology ==
=== DLSS 1 ===
The first iteration of DLSS is a predominantly spatial image upscaler with two stages, both relying on convolutional auto-encoder neural networks. The first step is an image enhancement network which uses the current frame and motion vectors to perform edge enhancement, and spatial anti-aliasing. The second stage is an image upscaling step which uses the single raw, low-resolution frame to upscale the image to the desired output resolution. Using just a single frame for upscaling means the neural network itself must generate a large amount of new information to produce the high-resolution output, which can result in slight hallucinations such as leaves that differ in style to the source content.

The neural networks are trained on a per-game basis by generating a "perfect frame" using traditional supersampling to 64 samples per pixel, as well as the motion vectors for each frame. The data collected must be as comprehensive as possible, including as many levels, times of day, graphical settings, resolutions, etc. as possible. This data is also augmented using common augmentations such as rotations, colour changes, and random noise to help generalize the test data. Training is performed on Nvidia's Saturn V supercomputer.

This first iteration received a mixed response, with many criticizing the often soft appearance and artifacts along with glitches in certain situations; likely a side effect of the limited data from only using a single frame input to the neural networks which could not be trained to perform optimally in all scenarios and edge-cases. Nvidia also demonstrated the ability for the auto-encoder networks to learn the ability to recreate depth-of-field and motion blur, although this functionality has never been included in a publicly released product.

=== DLSS 2 ===
DLSS 2 is a temporal anti-aliasing upsampling (TAAU) implementation, using data from previous frames extensively through sub-pixel jittering to resolve fine detail and reduce aliasing. The data DLSS 2 collects includes: the raw low-resolution input, motion vectors, depth buffers, and exposure / brightness information. It can also be used as a simpler TAA implementation where the image is rendered at 100% resolution, rather than being upsampled by DLSS, Nvidia brands this as DLAA (Deep Learning Anti-Aliasing).

TAA(U) is used in many modern video games and game engines; however, all previous implementations have used some form of manually written heuristics to prevent temporal artifacts such as ghosting and flickering. One example of this is neighborhood clamping which forcefully prevents samples collected in previous frames from deviating too much compared to nearby pixels in newer frames. This helps to identify and fix many temporal artifacts, but deliberately removing fine details in this way is analogous to applying a blur filter, and thus the final image can appear blurry when using this method.

DLSS 2 uses a convolutional auto-encoder neural network trained to identify and fix temporal artifacts, instead of manually programmed heuristics as mentioned above. Because of this, DLSS 2 can generally resolve detail better than other TAA and TAAU implementations, while also removing most temporal artifacts. This is why DLSS 2 can sometimes produce a sharper image than rendering at higher, or even native resolutions using traditional TAA. However, no temporal solution is perfect, and artifacts (ghosting in particular) are still visible in some scenarios when using DLSS 2.

Because temporal artifacts occur in most art styles and environments in broadly the same way, the neural network that powers DLSS 2 does not need to be retrained when being used in different games. Despite this, Nvidia does frequently ship new minor revisions of DLSS 2 with new titles, so this could suggest some minor training optimizations may be performed as games are released, although Nvidia does not provide changelogs for these minor revisions to confirm this. The main advancements compared to DLSS 1 include: significantly improved detail retention, a generalized neural network that does not need to be re-trained per-game, and ~2x less overhead (~1–2 ms vs ~2–4 ms).

Forms of TAAU such as DLSS 2 are not upscalers in the same sense as techniques such as ESRGAN or DLSS 1, which attempt to create new information from a low-resolution source; instead, TAAU works to recover data from previous frames, rather than creating new data. In practice, this means low resolution textures in games will still appear low-resolution when using current TAAU techniques. This is why Nvidia recommends game developers use higher resolution textures than they would normally for a given rendering resolution by applying a mip-map bias when DLSS 2 is enabled.

=== DLSS 3 ===
Augments DLSS 2 with improved image quality and the introduction of a new motion interpolation feature, called Frame Generation. The DLSS Frame Generation algorithm takes two rendered frames from the rendering pipeline and generates a new frame that smoothly transitions between them. For every frame rendered, one additional frame is generated. DLSS 3.0 makes use of a new generation of Optical Flow Accelerator (OFA) included in the Ada Lovelace GPU architecture (GeForce RTX 40 series) that is exclusive to them. The new OFA is said to be faster and more accurate than the one already available in previous Turing and Ampere RTX GPUs.

=== DLSS 3.5 ===
DLSS 3.5 adds Ray Reconstruction, replacing multiple denoising algorithms with a single AI model trained on five times more data than DLSS 3. Ray Reconstruction is available on all RTX GPUs and first targeted games with path tracing (aka "full ray tracing"), including Cyberpunk 2077's Phantom Liberty DLC, Portal with RTX, and Alan Wake 2.

=== DLSS 4 ===
The fourth generation of DLSS was unveiled alongside the GeForce RTX 50 series. DLSS 4 upscaling uses a new vision transformer-based model for enhanced image quality with reduced ghosting and greater image stability in motion compared to the previous convolutional neural network (CNN) model. DLSS 4 allows a greater number of frames to be generated and interpolated based on a single traditionally rendered frame. This form of frame generation called Multi Frame Generation is exclusive to the GeForce RTX 50 series while the GeForce RTX 40 series is limited to one interpolated frame per traditionally rendered frame. Nvidia claims that DLSS 4x Frame Generation model uses 30% less video memory with the example of Warhammer 40,000: Darktide using 400MB less memory at 4K resolution with Frame Generation enabled. Nvidia claims that 75 games will integrate DLSS 4 Multi Frame Generation at launch, including Alan Wake 2, Cyberpunk 2077, Indiana Jones and the Great Circle, and Star Wars Outlaws.

	GeForce RTX 20 series	GeForce RTX 30 series	GeForce RTX 40 series	GeForce RTX 50 series
Transformer Model	Yes	Yes	Yes	Yes
2× Frame Generation	No	No	Yes	Yes
3–4× Frame Generation	No	No	No	Yes

The table reflects Nvidia's official hardware support. In September 2026, third-party developers demonstrated Nvidia's own DLSS Frame Generation implementation running unofficially on RTX 30-series hardware, including both 2× and 4× modes.

=== DLSS 4.5 ===
DLSS 4.5 introduces Dynamic Multi Frame Generation, which can dynamically generate up to 6x the amount of frames for GeForce RTX 50-series GPUs, and upgrades the transformer model used for upscaling to a second-generation model for better temporal stability, ghosting and anti-aliasing.

On RTX 30 series and older, DLSS 4.5 is around 5 times more computationally demanding because "Nvidia is leveraging FP8 precision in RTX 40 and RTX 50 series cards for DLSS 4.5 to lessen the performance impact on newer cards."

=== DLSS 5 ===
DLSS 5, announced at GTC 2026, uses a neural rendering-based AI model to enhance lighting and material surfaces in real time at up to 32K resolution. Nvidia described the technology as retaining the developer's intended art style, while using color and motion-vector data to generate temporally stable lighting and material effects. DLSS 5 became available on 3 September 2026, debuting in NBA 2K27 for GeForce RTX 50 series GPUs and on GeForce Now.

=== Anti-aliasing ===
DLSS requires and applies its own anti-aliasing method. Thus, depending on the game and quality setting used, using DLSS may improve image quality even over native resolution rendering. It operates on similar principles to TAA. Like TAA, it uses information from past frames to produce the current frame. Unlike TAA, DLSS does not sample every pixel in every frame. Instead, it samples different pixels in different frames and uses pixels sampled in past frames to fill in the unsampled pixels in the current frame. DLSS uses machine learning to combine samples in the current frame and past frames, and is made possible by the available tensor cores. Nvidia also offers Deep Learning Anti-Aliasing (DLAA), which provides the same AI-driven anti-aliasing DLSS uses, but without any upscaling or downscaling.

== Hardware ==
With the exception of the shader-core version implemented in Control, DLSS is only available on GeForce RTX 20, GeForce RTX 30, GeForce RTX 40, GeForce RTX 50, and Quadro RTX series of video cards, using dedicated AI accelerators called Tensor Cores. Tensor Cores are available since the Nvidia Volta GPU microarchitecture, which was first used on the Tesla V100 line of products. They are used for doing fused multiply-add (FMA) operations that are used extensively in neural network calculations for applying a large series of multiplications on weights, followed by the addition of a bias. Tensor cores can operate on FP16, INT8, INT4, and INT1 data types. Each core can do 1024 bits of FMA operations per clock, so 1024 INT1, 256 INT4, 128 INT8, and 64 FP16 operations per clock per tensor core, and most Turing GPUs have a few hundred tensor cores. The Tensor Cores use CUDA Warp-Level Primitives on 32 parallel threads to take advantage of their parallel architecture. A Warp is a set of 32 threads which are configured to execute the same instruction. Since Windows 10 version 1903, Microsoft provided DirectML as one part of DirectX to support Tensor Cores.

== Quality presets ==
When using DLSS, depending on the game, users have access to various quality presets in addition to the option to set the internally rendered, upscaled resolution manually:

Standard DLSS presets
Quality preset (Note: The algorithm does not necessarily need to be implemented using these presets; it is possible for the implementer to define custom input and output resolutions.)	Scale factor (Note: The linear scale factor used for upsampling the input resolution to the output resolution. For example, a scene rendered at 540p with a 2.00× scale factor would have an output resolution of 1080p.)	Render scale (Note: The linear render scale, compared to the output resolution, that the technology uses to render scenes internally. For example, a 1080p scene with a 50% render scale would have an internal resolution of 540p.)
DLAA	1×	100%
Ultra Quality_{(unused)}	1.30×	77.0%
Quality	1.50×	66.7%
Balanced	1.72×	58.0%
Performance	2.00×	50.0%
Ultra Performance_{(since v2.1; only recommended for 8K resolution}_{)}	3.00×	33.3%
Auto	Rendered resolution dynamically adjusts in real time to achieve user-defined fps targets (e.g., 144 fps on a 144 Hz monitor).	

== Software ==
=== Manually upgrading DLSS ===
Users can manually replace the DLLs in games to support a newer version of DLSS. DLSS Swapper, an open source utility, can automatically do this for all installed games. Replacing DLL files can not add DLSS support or features to games that do not already implement them, though some mods can add frame generation support. It is also possible to override the DLSS version without touching game files via the Nvidia App.

=== Nvidia App DLSS model presets ===
While the Nvidia App does not specify the DLSS version used in each preset available, the following table summarizes this information.

Preset	Version	Model	Designed for
A	DLSS 2/3	CNN	Basic preset for Performance, Balanced and Quality tiers, made for games without all native DLSS inputs, like motion vectors
B	DLSS 2/3	CNN	Variant of preset A, improves on the Ultra Performance tier in high resolutions (4K+)
C	DLSS 2/3	CNN	Variant of preset A, designed for fast-paced games, less temporally stable images, but less ghosting
D	DLSS 2/3	CNN	Variant of preset A, designed for slower-paced games, more temporally stable images, but more ghosting
E	DLSS 2/3	CNN	Improved version of preset D, should be used over D in most cases
F	DLSS 2/3	CNN	Optimized for high resolutions (4K+), in Ultra Performance / DLAA quality tiers
J	DLSS 4	Transformer (first generation)	Baseline preset for transformer based DLSS, sharper but less temporally stable than K
K	DLSS 4	Transformer (first generation)	Variant of preset J, blurrier but more temporally stable than J
L	DLSS 4.5	Transformer (second generation)	Optimized for high resolutions (4K+), in Ultra Performance / DLAA quality tiers
M	DLSS 4.5	Transformer (second generation)	Optimized for lower resolutions, in Performance / Balanced / Quality DLSS tiers

== Reception ==
Particularly in early versions of DLSS, users reported blurry frames. Andrew Edelsten, an employee at Nvidia, therefore commented on the problem in a blog post in 2019 and promised that they were working on improving the technology and clarified that the DLSS AI algorithm was mainly trained with 4K image material. That the use of DLSS leads to particularly blurred images at lower resolutions, such as Full HD, is due to the fact that the algorithm has far less image information available to calculate an appropriate image compared to higher resolutions like 4K.

The use of DLSS Frame Generation leads to increased input latency, as well as visual artifacts. It has also been criticized that by implementing DLSS in their games, game developers no longer have an incentive to optimize them so that they also run smoothly in native resolution on modern PC hardware. For example, the game Cyberpunk 2077, in 4K at the highest graphics settings with path tracing enabled, cannot reach a stable 60fps without DLSS, even when using cards such as the Nvidia GeForce RTX 5090, currently one of the most powerful graphics cards to exist.

The transformer-based AI upscaling model introduced with DLSS 4 received moderate praise for its improved image quality with regard to increased stability, reduced ghosting, better anti-aliasing, and higher level of detail, as well as its backward compatibility and higher training scalability regarding future improvements.

ComputerBase found that "DLSS 4.5 effectively addresses the very issues that DLSS 4 still had problems with, and many of these issues have been partially or completely resolved." While "[t]he higher performance requirements are [...] not ideal", they "can generally be handled by RTX 4000 and RTX 5000 cards."

PC Games Hardware praised DLSS 4.5 Ray Reconstruction for retaining more details and faster adapting to changes in the image compared to the original version, but criticized it for introducing more shimmer. ComputerBase found that, while the feature did not improve in every aspect, it results in an overall slightly better image quality compared to its predecessor, with little performance costs.

=== DLSS 5 reactions ===
Upon its announcement at GTC 2026, DLSS 5 received significant backlash from both gamers and game developers on social media. Critics argued that the technology's neural rendering-based approach altered games' art direction in ways not intended by their developers, with some comparing its output to AI slop.

The technology's handling of human faces drew particular criticism. The Verge highlighted an example from EA Sports FC 26 in which Liverpool captain Virgil van Dijk's facial features were noticeably distorted by the technology, and compared the overall effect to motion smoothing on televisions. IGN characterized DLSS 5 as undermining the artistic craft of video game design, and Engadget argued that the negative reaction from gamers was justified. The technology was also criticized for its performance cost. Nvidia stated that enabling DLSS 5's neural rendering could reduce frame rates by approximately 50–60%, raising concerns about its practicality.

DLSS 5 increases power consumption, with early tests showing that an MSI Lightning Z RTX 5090 (a card which has 2 12V-2x6 connectors to allow it to consume over 600 watts) up to 802 watts in one early test, and other RTX 5090 cards slowing down while using less power. At least one user reports that a 12V-2x6 connector on an MSI GeForce RTX 5090 Gaming Trio OC was discovered to be melted and burned after testing DLSS 5 with NBA 2K27 which was the only game that officially supports DLSS 5 at the time of the test.

== See also ==
- FidelityFX Super Resolution – competing technology from AMD
- Intel XeSS – competing technology from Intel
- PlayStation Spectral Super Resolution – similar technology on Sony's PlayStation 5 Pro
