= TXAA =

TXAA or TxAA can refer to:

- Temporal anti-aliasing
- Transmit Antenna Array, used in beamforming
