= Posterization =

Image conversion technique

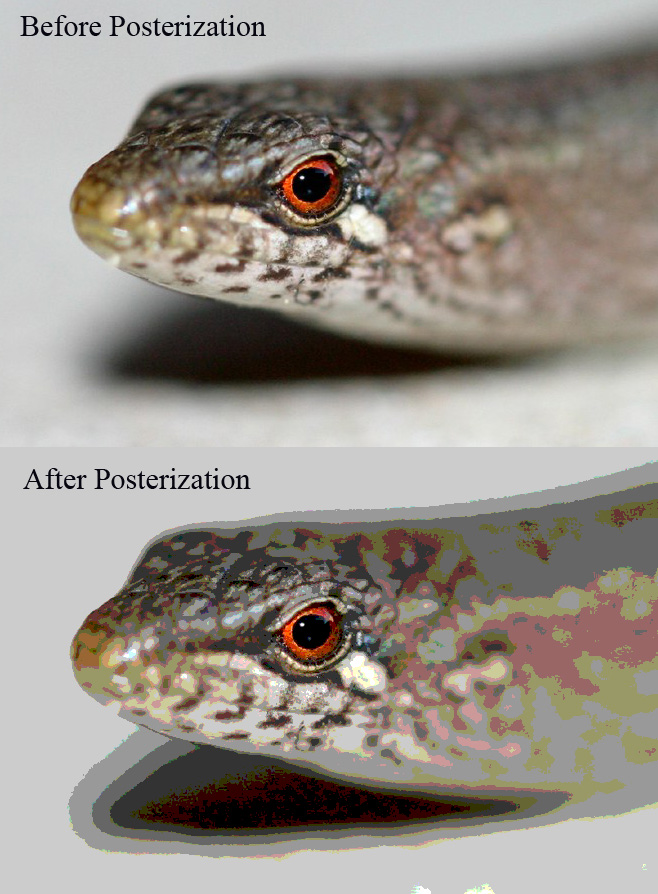
Example of a photograph in JPEG format (24-bit color or 16.7 million colors) before posterization, contrasting the result of saving to GIF format (256 colors). Posterization occurs across the image, but is most obvious in areas of subtle variation in tone.

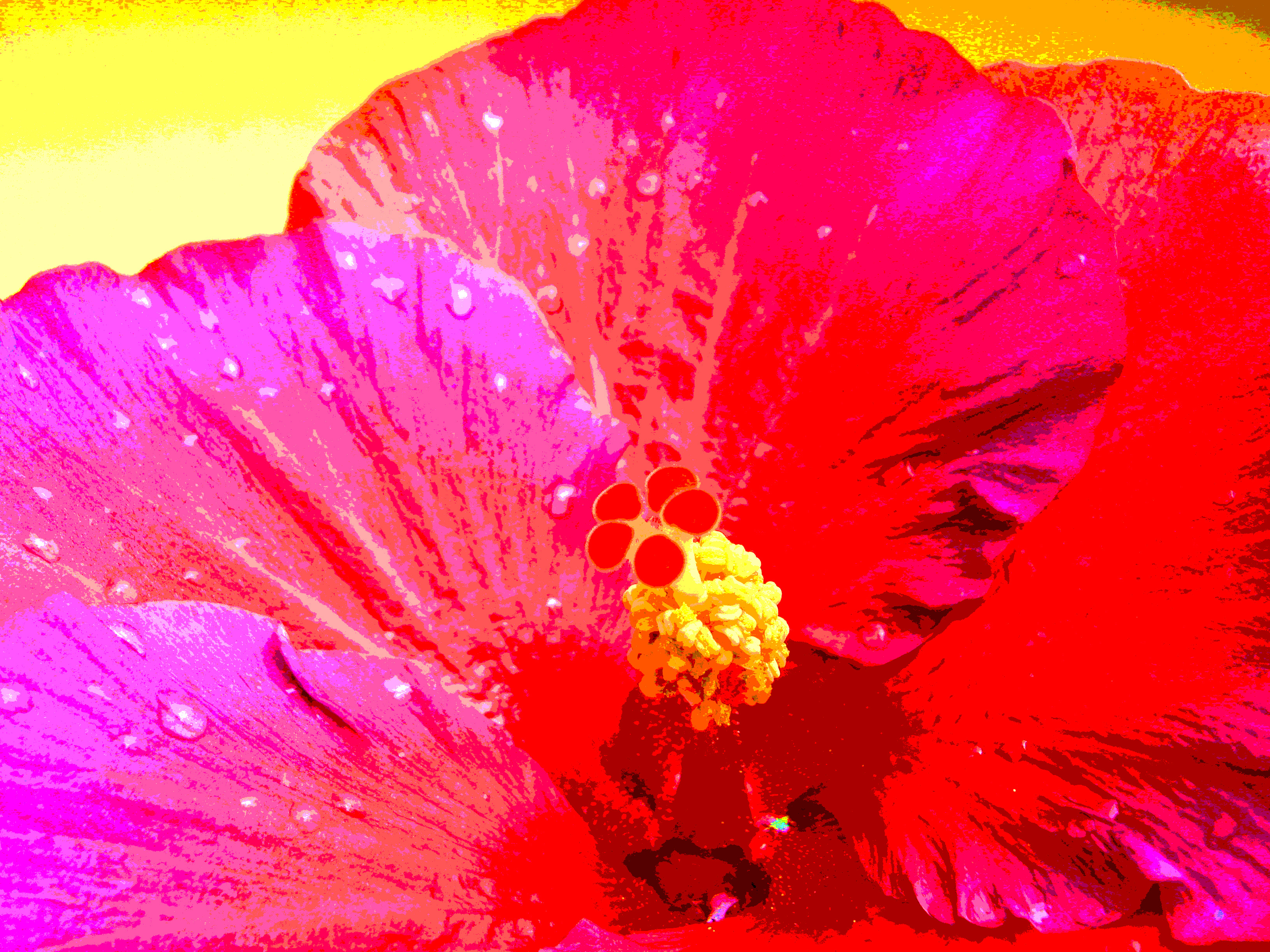
Posterized photo of a hibiscus

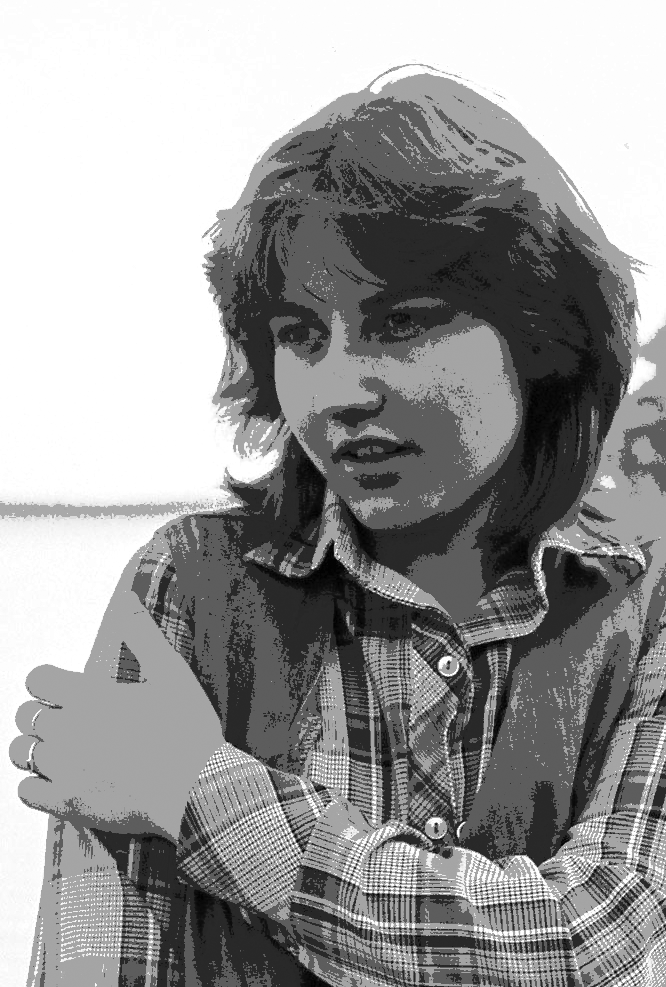
Posterized photo

Posterization or posterisation of an image is the conversion of a continuous gradation of tone to several regions of fewer tones, causing abrupt changes from one tone to another. This was originally done with photographic processes to create posters. It can now be done photographically or with digital image processing, and may be deliberate or an unintended artifact of color quantization. Posterization is often the first step in vectorization (tracing) of an image.

== Cause ==
The effect may be created deliberately, or happen accidentally. For artistic effect, most image editing programs provide a posterization feature, or photographic processes may be used.

Unwanted posterization, also known as banding, may occur when the color depth, sometimes called bit depth, is insufficient to accurately sample a continuous gradation of color tone. As a result, a continuous gradient appears as a series of discrete steps or bands of color — hence the name. When discussing fixed pixel displays, such as LCD and plasma televisions, this effect is referred to as false contouring. Additionally, compression in image formats such as JPEG can also result in posterization when a smooth gradient of colour or luminosity is compressed into discrete quantized blocks with stepped gradients. The result may be compounded further by an optical illusion, called the Mach band illusion, in which each band appears to have an intensity gradient in the direction opposing the overall gradient. This problem may be resolved, in part, with dithering.

== Photographic process ==
Posterization is a process in photograph development which converts normal photographs into an image consisting of distinct, but flat, areas of different tones or colors. A posterized image often has the same general appearance, but portions of the original image that presented gradual transitions are replaced by abrupt changes in shading and gradation from one area of tone to another.

Printing posterization from black and white requires density separations which is then printed on the same piece of paper to create the whole image. Separations may be made by density or color, using different exposures. Density separations may be created by printing three prints of the same picture, each at a different exposure time that will be combined for the final image.

Modern uses of posterization also include thresholding or color segmentation that transform the image into a simplified version with fewer, highly contrasting colors.

== Applications ==
Typically, posterization is used for tracing contour lines and vectorizing photo-realistic images. This tracing process starts with 1 bit per channel and advances to 4 bits per channel. As the bits per channel increase, the number of levels of lightness a color can display increases.

A visual artist, faced with line art that has been damaged through JPEG compression, may consider posterizing the image as a first step to remove artifacts on the edges of the image.

Studies show that using posterization can significantly improve the ability to locate landmarks or subjects in outdoor photography.

== Video posterization ==
Temporal posterization is the visual effect of reducing the number of frames of video, while not reducing the total time it takes the video to play. This compares to regular posterization, where the number of individual color variations is reduced, while the overall range of colors is not. The motion effect is similar to the effect of a flashing strobe light, but without the contrast of bright and dark. Unlike a pulldown, the unused frames are simply discarded, and it is intended to be apparent (longer than the persistence of vision that video and motion pictures normally depend on). An animated GIF often looks posterized because of its normally-low frame rate.

More formally, this is downsampling in the time dimension, as it is reducing the resolution (precision of the input), not the bit rate (precision of the output, as in posterization).

The resulting stop-go motion is a temporal form of jaggies; formally, a form of aliasing. This effect may be the intention, but to reduce the frame rate without introducing this effect, one may use temporal anti-aliasing, which yields motion blur.

Compare with time stretching, which adds frames.

== See also ==
- Downsampling
- Quantization error
- Discretization error
- Color quantization
- Level-set method
