= Leadwerks =

Cross-platform game engine

Leadwerks Game Engine
- Developer: Leadwerks Software
- Release: March 1, 2006; 20 years ago
- Stable release: 5.0.2 / February 20, 2026; 8 months ago
- Written in: C++, Objective-C, Lua
- Operating system: Windows, Linux
- Platform: Windows, Linux
- Available in: English
- Type: Game engine
- License: Proprietary license
- Website: www.leadwerks.com

Leadwerks (/ˈlɛdwɜːrks/ LED-wurks) is a cross-platform game engine developed by Leadwerks Software that focuses on ease of use and learning. The software supports Windows and Linux, with OS X support in development. Leadwerks is currently on its fourth major version and is sold through the Steam digital distribution platform.

== Overview ==
Leadwerks is written in the C++ programming language and makes use of the OpenGL 4.0 graphics API. Newton Dynamics is used for physics. Scripting is provided by the Lua programming language, with LuaJIT employed for just-in-time compilation of scripts to machine code. An AI navigation system is included, based on the Recast library. OpenAL is used for audio.

Leadwerks Game Engine is marketed as an easy to learn game development system, with three layers of development intended to ease the learning curve. The flowgraph system and visual editor allow simple games to be created without programming. Lua script allows more advanced game mechanics and custom behavior, while C++ can be used for low-level programming and importing external libraries.

== Licenses ==
The standard version of Leadwerks Game supports Lua programming. The C++ SDK DLC adds support for C++ programming, with project templates for Visual Studio and the Code::Blocks IDE for Linux. Several model pack DLCs are also available, as well as a store for user-created 3D models, textures, scripts, and sounds, built on the Steam Workshop system. The end user license agreement allows any licensee to publish royalty-free commercial games. A splash screen is not required to be shown.

== History ==
Leadwerks Game Engine began as a free companion to the BSP map editor 3D World Studio. Version 1.0 of Leadwerks Game Engine was released in 2007. The engine utilized OpenGL 2.1 and used a combination of texture-based lightmaps and per-vertex lighting.

Version 2 was released in May 2008 and utilized shadow maps in a forward renderer. In version 2.1 the renderer was switched to a deferred renderer, making Leadwerks the second commercial game engine in the world to utilize this now-common technique (the first being the X-Ray Engine that powers the S.T.A.L.K.E.R. series of games by GSC Game World).

Version 3 was released in April 2013 at the Game Developer's Conference. This was the first multiplatform version, with support for Windows, Mac, iOS, and Android provided on day one. Support for mobile graphics hindered the capabilities of the renderer on PC, and the changes were poorly received by the existing user base. In June of the same year, the company launched a Kickstarter campaign for Linux support, raising $42,000 in six weeks. In January 2014, version 3.1 was launched on Steam with support for Windows and Linux, a new deferred renderer, and mobile support removed. During the 2014 Steam Winter Sale, Leadwerks Game Engine won the Community Choice Award and was featured on the front page of Steam.

Version 4 was released in December 2015 with a new vegetation system for displaying large amounts of foliage with minimal memory usage. Around this time, it was announced that the software had attracted over 10,000 users.
