= Alpha to coverage =

Multisampling computer graphics technique

Alpha to coverage is a multisampling computer graphics technique, that replaces alpha blending with a coverage mask. This achieves order-independent transparency for when anti-aliasing or semi-transparent textures are used. This particular technique is useful for situations where dense foliage or grass must be rendered in a video game.

Alpha to coverage is a sub-pixel version of screen-door transparency, a technique which uses a dithering pattern to simulate transparency with only fully opaque and fully transparent pixels.

== Mechanism ==
Alpha-to-coverage converts the alpha component output from the pixel shader into a temporary coverage mask, where the number of bits set is a function of the alpha value. This temporary mask is then bitwise ANDed with the fragment's coverage mask. To ensure consistency as alpha values change, the generated mask is required to be monotonic: the mask for a smaller alpha value must be a subset of the mask for a larger value.

Because the mask is applied at the sub-pixel resolution of a multisample render target, the number of available transparency levels is limited by the sample count. For example, 4x MSAA allows for five distinct coverage levels (0 to 4 samples), which can lead to Quantization (image processing) artifacts.

== See also ==
- Spatial anti-aliasing
- Multisample anti-aliasing
- Color depth
