= Michael Deering =

American computer scientist

Michael Frank Deering
- Born: 1956 (age 69–70)
- Education: University of California, Berkeley
- Known for: Deferred shading, Geometry compression, Java 3D API, predictive head trackers, 3D-RAM
- Notable work: The SAGE Graphics Architecture, Geometry Compression, The Java 3D API Specification
- Scientific career
- Fields: Computer science, Artificial intelligence, Computer graphics, Virtual reality, VLSI design
- Workplaces: Sun Microsystems
- Thesis: Real-Time Natural Scene Analysis for a Blind Prosthesis (1981)
- Doctoral advisor: Lotfi Zadeh

Michael Frank Deering (born 1956) is a computer scientist, a former chief engineer for Sun Microsystems in Mountain View, California, and a widely recognized expert on artificial intelligence, computer vision, 3D graphics hardware/software, very-large-scale integration (VLSI) design and virtual reality. Deering oversaw Sun's 3D graphics technical strategy as the chief hardware graphics architect and is a co-architect of the Java 3D API, developing Java platform software. He is the inventor of deferred shading, inventor of Geometry compression, co-inventor of 3D-RAM, and the chief architect for a number of Sun's 3D graphics hardware accelerators. Many of his inventions have been patented.

Deering's research endeavors have included development of correct perspective viewing equations, correcting for the optics of both human eyeballs and glass cathode-ray tubes, predictive head trackers and other virtual reality interface hardware.

Deering has published articles on computer graphics architectures, virtual reality systems, and 3D interface technologies.

== Education and early career ==
In 1978, Deering received his bachelor's degree, and in 1981 his PhD, in computer science from the University of California, Berkeley, and is an alumnus of the Berkeley Artificial Intelligence Research (BAIR) Computer Science Division, UC Berkeley.

Prior to his tenure with Sun, Deering worked for Schlumberger Laboratories in Palo Alto, California, engaged in graphics and imaging research.

== Published works ==
- 2002 'The SAGE graphics architecture', Michael Deering, David Naegle, ACM Transactions on Graphics, Proceedings of the 29th annual conference on Computer graphics and interactive techniques SIGGRAPH '02, volume 21, no 3, ACM Press
- 2000 The Java 3d API Specification with Cdrom, Henry Sowizral, Kevin Rushforth, Michael Deering, Addison-Wesley Longman Publishing Co.
- 1998 "Introduction to Programming with Java 3D", Henry Sowizral, Dave Nadeau, Michael Deering, Mike Bailey, Proceedings of the 25th annual conference on Computer graphics and interactive techniques, SIGGRAPH '98, ACM Press
- 1995 "Geometry compression", Michael Deering, Proceedings of the 22nd annual conference on Computer graphics and interactive techniques, SIGGRAPH '95, vol 29, p 13-20, ACM Press, ISBN 0-89791-701-4
- 1992 "High resolution virtual reality", Michael Deering, Proceedings of the 19th annual conference on Computer graphics and interactive techniques SIGGRAPH '92, vol 26, no 2, p 195-202, ACM Press
- 1988 "The triangle processor and normal vector shader: a VLSI system for high performance graphics", Michael Deering, Stephanie Winner, Bic Schediwy, Chris Duffy, Neil Hunt, Proceedings of the 15th annual conference on Computer graphics and interactive techniques, SIGGRAPH '88, vol 22, no 4, p 21-30, ACM Press
- 1986 Database Support for Storage of AI Reasoning Knowledge. In Expert Database Systems, M. Deering, J. Faletti, Benjamin Cummings (publisher)
