= Deep Learning Anti-Aliasing =

Computer graphics anti-aliasing algorithm

Deep Learning Anti-Aliasing (DLAA) is a form of spatial anti-aliasing developed by Nvidia. DLAA depends on and requires Tensor Cores available in Nvidia RTX cards.

DLAA is similar to Deep Learning Super Sampling (DLSS) in its anti-aliasing method, with one important differentiation being that the goal of DLSS is to increase performance at the cost of image quality, whereas the main priority of DLAA is improving image quality at the cost of performance (irrelevant of resolution upscaling or downscaling). DLAA is similar to temporal anti-aliasing (TAA) in that they are both spatial anti-aliasing solutions relying on past frame data. Compared to TAA, DLAA is substantially better when it comes to shimmering, flickering, and handling small meshes like wires.

== Technical overview ==
DLAA collects game rendering data including raw low-resolution input, motion vectors, depth buffers, and exposure information. This information feeds into a convolutional neural network that processes the image to reduce aliasing while preserving fine detail.

The neural network architecture employs an auto-encoder design trained on high-quality reference images. The training dataset includes diverse scenarios focusing on challenging cases like sub-pixel details, high-contrast edges, and transparent surfaces. The network then processes frames in real-time.

Unlike traditional anti-aliasing solutions that rely on manually written heuristics, such as TAA, DLAA uses its neural network to preserve fine details while eliminating unwanted visual artifacts.

== History ==
DLAA was initially called and marketed by Nvidia as DLSS 2x. The first game that added support for DLAA was The Elder Scrolls Online, which implemented the feature in 2021. By June 2022, DLAA was only available in six games. This number rose to 17 by February 2023. In June 2023, TechPowerUp reported that "DLAA is seeing sluggish adoption among game developers", and that Nvidia was working on adding DLAA to the quality presets of DLSS to boost adoption. By December 2023, DLAA was supported in 41 games. In early 2025, an update for the Nvidia App added a driver-based DLSS override feature that enables users to activate DLAA even in games that do not support it natively.

== Differences between TAA and DLAA ==
TAA is used in many modern video games and game engines; however, all previous implementations have used some form of manually written heuristics to prevent temporal artifacts such as ghosting and flickering. One example of this is neighborhood clamping which forcefully prevents samples collected in previous frames from deviating too much compared to nearby pixels in newer frames. This helps to identify and fix many temporal artifacts, but deliberately removing fine details in this way is analogous to applying a blur filter, and thus the final image can appear blurry when using this method.

DLAA uses an auto-encoder convolutional neural network trained to identify and fix temporal artifacts, instead of manually programmed heuristics as mentioned above. Because of this, DLAA can generally resolve detail better than other TAA and TAAU implementations, while also removing most temporal artifacts.

== Differences between DLSS and DLAA ==
While DLSS handles upscaling with a focus on performance, DLAA handles anti-aliasing with a focus on visual quality. DLAA runs at the given screen resolution with no upscaling or downscaling functionality provided by DLAA.

DLSS and DLAA share the same AI-driven anti-aliasing method. As such, DLAA functions like DLSS without the upscaling part. Both are made by Nvidia and require Tensor Cores. However, DLSS and DLAA cannot be enabled at the same time, only one can be selected depending on whether performance or image quality is prioritized.

== Reception ==
TechPowerUp found that "[c]ompared to TAA and DLSS, DLAA is clearly producing the best image quality, especially at lower resolutions", arguing that, while "DLSS was already doing a better job than TAA at reconstructing small objects", "DLAA does an even better job".

In a Cyberpunk 2077 performance test, IGN stated that "DLAA provided somewhat similar results [FPS wise] to the normal raster mode in most cases but got significant performance boost with the help of frame generation", a feature not available when using native resolution.

Rock Paper Shotgun noted that, while DLAA is "not a completely perfect form of anti-aliasing, as the occasional jaggies are present", it "looks a lot sharper overall [than TAA], and especially in motion."

According to PC World, "DLAA offers very good anti-aliasing without losing visual information — alternatives like TAA tend to struggle during motion-filled scenes, where DLAA doesn’t. Furthermore, DLAA’s loss of performance is lower than with conventional anti-aliasing methods."
