= Morphological antialiasing =

Antialiasing technique

Morphological antialiasing (MLAA) is a spatial anti-aliasing technique, meaning that it reduces artifacts, such as jaggies, when representing a high-resolution image at a lower resolution. MLAA is a post-process filtering which detects borders in the resulting image and then finds specific patterns in these. The anti-aliasing effect is achieved by blending pixels in these borders, according to the pattern they belong to and their position within the pattern. It is most commonly used in real-time computer graphics.

Introduced in 2009, MLAA was an early and influential example of anti-aliasing techniques done in post-processing—applied as a final step to aliased, rendered images—which makes them suitable for deferred shading. A similar method done in post-processing is fast approximate anti-aliasing (FXAA). Another post-process, temporally-amortized supersampling, commonly known as temporal anti-aliasing, has become the most common anti-aliasing method for real-time rendering and video games.

Enhanced subpixel morphological antialiasing (SMAA) is a type of MLAA developed by Universidad de Zaragoza and Crytek in 2011. SMAA improves on traditional MLAA with better pattern recognition (especially for diagonal edges) and local contrast adaptation, which accounts for human perception of edge contrast.

Conservative morphological anti-aliasing (CMAA) is a type of MLAA developed by Filip Strugar at Intel in 2014. CMAA uses four main steps which are image analysis for color discontinuities, locally dominant edge detection, simple shape handling, and lastly symmetrical long edge shape handling. It requires less computation than traditional MLAA, preserves more image sharpness, and has better results on long edges. In 2018, Intel unveiled CMAA2, an updated version.

== See also ==
- Anisotropic filtering
