= Depth peeling =

Rendering method for order-independent transparency

In computer graphics, depth peeling is an exact multipass method of order-independent transparency that extracts transparent fragments into depth layers and composites those layers in depth order. Depth peeling has the advantage of being able to generate correct results even for complex images containing intersecting transparent objects.

== Method ==
Depth peeling works by rendering the image multiple times. Depth peeling uses two Z buffers, one that works conventionally, and one that is not modified, and sets the minimum distance at which a fragment can be drawn without being discarded. For each pass, the previous pass' conventional Z-buffer is used as the minimal Z-buffer, so each pass removes already-captured nearer fragments and draws the next depth layer behind them. The resulting images can then be composited in depth order to form a single image. A major drawback of classical depth peeling is performance: it requires one geometry pass per peeled layer, so scenes with high depth complexity require many passes that each re-rasterize the transparent geometry. Later variants reduce the number of passes by peeling multiple layers or both front and back layers in a pass. Dual depth peeling reduces the geometry-pass count from N to N/2+1 by peeling one layer from the front and one from the back in each pass, while multi-layer depth peeling peels several layers per pass and reported up to an 8x speed-up in RGBA8 settings.
