= Supersampling =

Spatial anti-aliasing method

Calculating the end color value

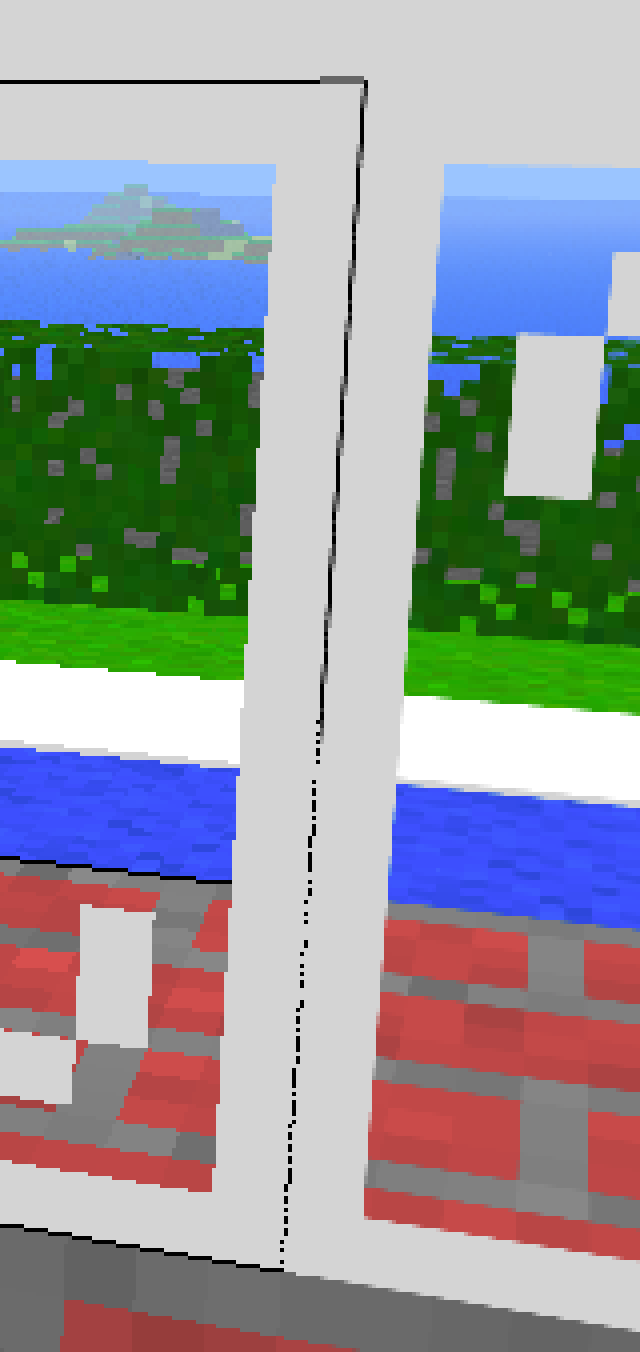
Comparison of a rendered scene without (left side) and with supersampling anti-aliasing applied (right) (Not applying AA is analogous to a nearest-neighbor interpolation.)

Supersampling or supersampling anti-aliasing (SSAA) is a spatial anti-aliasing method, i.e. a method used to remove aliasing (jagged and pixelated edges, colloquially known as "jaggies") from images rendered in computer games or other computer programs that generate imagery. Aliasing occurs because unlike real-world objects, which have continuous smooth curves and lines, a computer screen shows the viewer a large number of small squares. These pixels all have the same size, and each one has a single color. A line can only be shown as a collection of pixels, and therefore appears jagged unless it is perfectly horizontal or vertical. The aim of supersampling is to reduce this effect. Color samples are taken at several instances inside the pixel (not just at the center as normal)—hence the term "supersampling"—and an average color value is calculated. This can for example be achieved by rendering the image at a much higher resolution than the one being displayed, then shrinking it to the desired size, using the extra pixels for calculation, with the result being a downsampled image with smoother transitions from one line of pixels to another along the edges of objects, but each pixel could also be supersampled using other strategies (see the Supersampling patterns section). The number of samples determines the quality of the output.

== Motivation ==
Aliasing is manifested in the case of 2D images as moiré pattern and pixelated edges, colloquially known as "jaggies". Common signal processing and image processing knowledge suggests that to achieve perfect elimination of aliasing, proper spatial sampling at the Nyquist rate (or higher) after applying a 2D Anti-aliasing filter is required. As this approach would require a forward and inverse fourier transformation, computationally less demanding approximations like supersampling were developed to avoid domain switches by staying in the spatial domain ("image domain").

== Method ==
=== Computational cost and adaptive supersampling ===
Supersampling is computationally expensive because it requires much greater video card memory and memory bandwidth, since the amount of buffer used is several times larger. A way around this problem is to use a technique known as adaptive supersampling, where only pixels at the edges of objects are supersampled.

Initially only a few samples are taken within each pixel. If these values are very similar, only these samples are used to determine the color. If not, more are used. The result of this method is that a higher number of samples are calculated only where necessary, thus improving performance.

=== Supersampling patterns ===
When taking samples within a pixel, the sample positions have to be determined in some way. Although the number of ways in which this can be done is infinite, there are a few ways which are commonly used.

Grid algorithm in uniform distribution

Rotated grid algorithm (with 2 × the sample density)

Random algorithm

Jitter algorithm

Poisson disc algorithm

Quasi-Monte Carlo method algorithm

N-Rooks

RGSS

High-resolution antialiasing (HRAA), Quincunx

Flipquad

Fliptri

==== Grid ====
The simplest algorithm. The pixel is split into several sub-pixels, and a sample is taken from the center of each. It is fast and easy to implement. Although, due to the regular nature of sampling, aliasing can still occur if a low number of sub-pixels is used.

==== Random ====
Also known as stochastic sampling, it avoids the regularity of grid supersampling. However, due to the irregularity of the pattern, samples end up being unnecessary in some areas of the pixel and lacking in others.

==== Poisson disk ====
Point samples generated using Poisson disk sampling, and graphical representation of the minimum inter-point distance

The Poisson disk sampling algorithm places the samples randomly, but then checks that any two are not too close. The end result is an even but random distribution of samples. The naive "dart throwing" algorithm is extremely slow for large data sets, which once limited its applications for real-time rendering. However, many fast algorithms now exist to generate Poisson disk noise, even those with variable density. The Delone set provides a mathematical description of such sampling.

==== Jittered ====
A modification of the grid algorithm to approximate the Poisson disk. A pixel is split into several sub-pixels, but a sample is not taken from the center of each, but from a random point within the sub-pixel. Congregation can still occur, but to a lesser degree.

==== Rotated grid ====
A 2×2 grid layout is used but the sample pattern is rotated to avoid samples aligning on the horizontal or vertical axis, greatly improving antialiasing quality for the most commonly encountered cases. For an optimal pattern, the rotation angle is arctan (1/2) (about 26.6°) and the square is stretched by a factor of √5/2, making it also a 4-queens solution.

== See also ==
- Oversampling
- Multisample anti-aliasing
- Quincunx
- Graphics card
- Graphics processing unit
- Ray tracing (graphics)
- Framebuffer
- Game engine
- Image scaling
- 2×SaI
- Deep Learning Super Sampling
