= Video denoising =

Video denoising is the process of removing noise from a video signal. Video denoising methods can be divided into:

- Spatial video denoising methods, where image noise reduction is applied to each frame individually.
- Temporal video denoising methods, where noise between frames is reduced. Motion compensation may be used to avoid ghosting artifacts when blending together pixels from several frames.
- Spatial-temporal video denoising methods use a combination of spatial and temporal denoising. This is often referred to as 3D denoising.

== Overview ==
Video denoising is done in two areas: they are chroma and luminance; chroma noise is where one sees color fluctuations, and luminance is where one sees light/dark fluctuations. Generally, the luminance noise looks more like film grain, while chroma noise looks more unnatural or digital-like.

Video denoising methods are designed and tuned for specific types of noise. Typical video noise types are the following:

- Analog noise
  - Radio channel artifacts
    - High-frequency interference (dots, short horizontal color lines, etc.)
    - Brightness and color channel interference (problems with antenna)
    - Video reduplication – false contouring appearance
  - VHS artifacts
    - Color-specific degradation
    - Brightness and color channel interference (specific type for VHS)
    - Chaotic line shift at the end of frame (lines resync signal misalignment)
    - Wide horizontal noise strips (old VHS or obstruction of magnetic heads)
  - Film artifacts (see also Film preservation)
    - Dust, dirt, spray
    - Scratches
    - Curling (emulsion exfoliation)
    - Fingerprints
- Digital noise
  - Blocking – low bitrate artifacts
  - Ringing – low and medium bitrates artifact, especially on animated cartoons
  - Blocks (slices) damage in case of losses in digital transmission channel or disk injury (scratches on DVD)

Different suppression methods are used to remove all these artifacts from video.

== See also ==
- Video matting
- Image denoising
- Soap opera effect
