= Jaggies =

Jagged edge artifacts in raster images

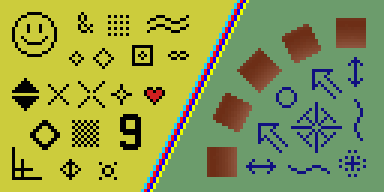
This pixel art was scaled up using nearest-neighbor interpolation. Thus, the "jaggies" on the edges of the symbols became more prominent.

Jaggies are visual artifacts in raster images, most frequently from aliasing, which in turn is often caused by non-linear mixing effects producing high-frequency components, or missing or poor anti-aliasing filtering prior to sampling.

Jaggies are stair-like lines that appear where there should be "smooth" straight lines or curves. For example, when a nominally straight, un-aliased line steps across one pixel either horizontally or vertically, a "dogleg" occurs halfway through the line, where it crosses the threshold from one pixel to the other.

Jaggies should not be confused with most compression artifacts, which are a different phenomenon.

== Causes ==
Jaggies occur due to the "staircase effect". This is because a line represented in raster mode is approximated by a sequence of pixels. Jaggies can occur for a variety of reasons, the most common being that the output device (display monitor or printer) does not have sufficient resolution to portray a smooth line. In addition, jaggies often occur when a bit-mapped image is scaled to a higher resolution. This is one of the advantages that vector graphics have over bitmapped graphics – a vector image can be losslessly scaled to any arbitrary resolution or stretched infinitely in either axis without introducing jaggies.

== Solutions ==
The effect of jaggies can be reduced by a graphics technique known as spatial anti-aliasing. Anti-aliasing smooths out jagged lines by surrounding them with transparent pixels to simulate the appearance of fractionally-filled pixels when viewed at a distance. The downside of anti-aliasing is that it reduces contrast – rather than sharp black/white transitions, there are shades of gray – and the resulting image can appear fuzzy. This is an inescapable trade-off: if the resolution is insufficient to display the desired detail, the output will either be jagged, fuzzy, or some combination thereof. While machine learning-based upscaling techniques such as DLSS can be used to infer this missing information, other types of artifacts may be introduced in the process.

In real-time 3D rendering such as in video games, various anti-aliasing techniques are used to remove jaggies created by the edges of polygons and other contrasting lines. Since anti-aliasing can impose a significant performance overhead, games for home computers often allow users to choose the level and type of anti-aliasing in use in order to optimize their experience, whereas on consoles this setting is typically fixed for each title to ensure a consistent experience. While anti-aliasing is generally implemented through graphics APIs like DirectX and Vulkan, some consoles such as the Xbox 360 and PlayStation 3 are also capable of anti-aliasing to little direct performance cost by way of dedicated hardware which performs anti-aliasing on the contents of the framebuffer once it has been rendered by the GPU. Jaggies in bitmaps, such as sprites and surface materials, are most often dealt with by separate texture filtering routines, which are far easier to perform than anti-aliasing filtering. Texture filtering became ubiquitous on PCs after the introduction of 3Dfx's Voodoo GPU.

== Notable uses of the term ==
In the 1985 game Rescue on Fractalus! for the Atari 8-bit computers, the graphics depicting the cockpit of the player's spacecraft contains two window struts, which are not anti-aliased and are therefore very "jagged". The developers made fun of this and named the in-game enemies "Jaggi", and also initially titled the game Behind Jaggi Lines!. The latter idea was scrapped by the marketing department before release.

== See also ==
- Image scaling
  - Comparison gallery of image scaling algorithms
  - Pixel-art scaling algorithms
- Posterization
