= Polynomial identity =

Polynomial identity may refer to:

- Algebraic identities of polynomials (see Factorization)
- Polynomial identity ring
- Polynomial identity testing
