= VNP =

VNP may refer to:

- VNP, standing for Valiant's NP, an arithmetic circuit complexity class
- Ventricular Natriuretic Peptide, an alternative name for Brain natriuretic peptide
- Voters Not Politicians, a political movement in Michigan
- Voyageurs National Park, northern Minnesota, USA
- Vulcan nerve pinch, a fictional manoeuvre
- Video Network Platform
- Virtual Network Protocol
- Beijing South railway station, China Railway telegraph code VNP
- von Neumann probe
