= Anisotropy =

In geometry, property of being directionally dependent

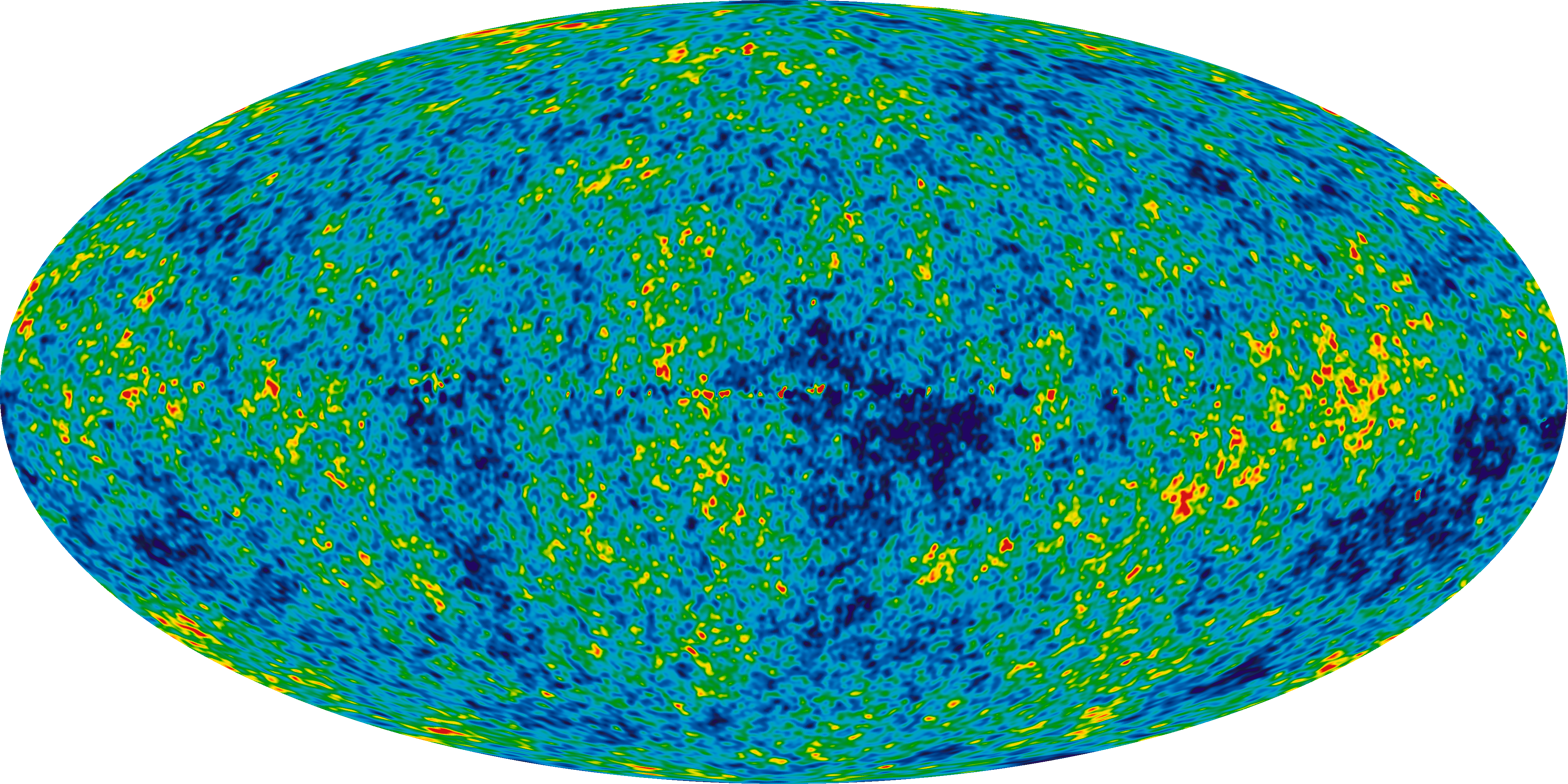
WMAP image of the tiny anisotropies in the cosmic microwave background radiation

Anisotropy (/ˌænaɪˈsɒtrəpi, ˌænɪ-/) is the structural property of non-uniformity in different directions, as opposed to isotropy. An anisotropic object or pattern has physical or mechanical properties such as absorbance, refractive index, conductivity, and tensile strength that differ according to direction of application or measurement.

Examples of anisotropy include light coming through a polarizer; another is wood, which is easier to split along its grain than across it because of the directional non-uniformity of the grain (the grain is the same in one direction, not all directions).

== Fields of interest ==
=== Computer graphics ===
In the field of computer graphics, an anisotropic surface changes in appearance as it rotates about its geometric normal, as is the case with velvet.

Anisotropic filtering (AF) is a method of enhancing the image quality of textures on surfaces that are far away and viewed at a shallow angle. Older techniques, such as bilinear and trilinear filtering, do not take into account the angle a surface is viewed from, which can result in aliasing or blurring of textures. By reducing detail in one direction more than another, these effects can be reduced easily.

=== Chemistry ===
A chemical anisotropic filter is a membrane with increasingly smaller interstitial spaces in the direction of filtration so that the proximal regions filter out larger particles while distal regions progressively remove smaller particles. This gradient structure prevents surface clogging, resulting in greater flow-through and more efficient filtration than uniform-pore filters.

In fluorescence spectroscopy, fluorescence anisotropy is calculated from the polarization properties of fluorescence emitted by samples excited with plane-polarized light. When a fluorophore absorbs polarized light, it may rotate before re-emitting a photon, and anisotropy measurements reveal the average angular displacement that occurs between absorption and emission. This makes fluorescence anisotropy a useful tool for determining the shape of a macromolecule or studying its local molecular mobility.

In NMR spectroscopy, the orientation of nuclei with respect to the applied magnetic field determines their chemical shift. Anisotropic systems arise from molecules with regions of delocalized electron density, such as the π (pi) system of benzene, where circulating π electrons generate a diamagnetic ring current that produces a secondary magnetic field. Depending on the spatial position of nearby nuclei, this secondary field either reinforces or opposes the applied field, causing the observed chemical shift to change, this is known as chemical shift anisotropy.

=== Real-world imagery ===
Images of a gravity-bound or man-made environment are particularly anisotropic in the orientation domain, with more image structure located at orientations parallel with or orthogonal to the direction of gravity (vertical and horizontal).

=== Physics ===
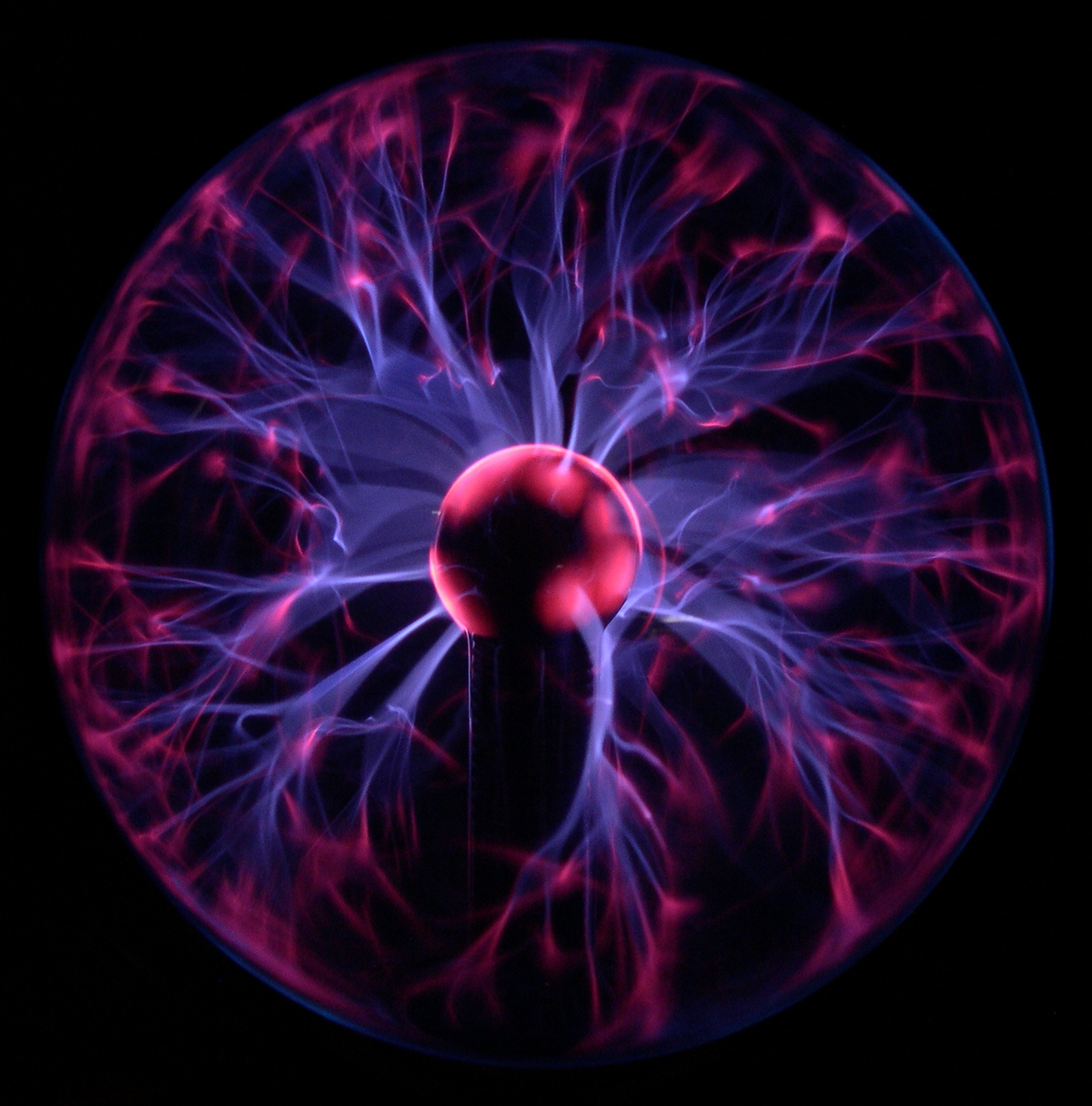
A plasma globe displaying the nature of plasmas, in this case, the phenomenon of "filamentation"

Physicists from University of California, Berkeley reported about their detection of the cosmic anisotropy in cosmic microwave background radiation in 1977. Their experiment demonstrated the Doppler shift caused by the movement of the earth with respect to the early Universe matter, the source of the radiation. Cosmic anisotropy has also been seen in the alignment of galaxies' rotation axes and polarization angles of quasars.

Physicists use the term anisotropy to describe direction-dependent properties of materials. Magnetic anisotropy, for example, may occur in a plasma, so that its magnetic field is oriented in a preferred direction. Plasmas may also show "filamentation" (such as that seen in lightning or a plasma globe) that is directional.

An anisotropic liquid has the fluidity of a normal liquid, but has an average structural order relative to each other along the molecular axis, unlike water or chloroform, which contain no structural ordering of the molecules. Liquid crystals are examples of anisotropic liquids.

Some materials conduct heat in a way that is isotropic, that is independent of spatial orientation around the heat source. Heat conduction is more commonly anisotropic, which implies that detailed geometric modeling of typically diverse materials being thermally managed is required. The materials used to transfer and reject heat from the heat source in electronics are often anisotropic.

Many crystals are anisotropic to light ("optical anisotropy"), and exhibit properties such as birefringence. Crystal optics describes light propagation in these media. An "axis of anisotropy" is defined as the axis along which isotropy is broken (or an axis of symmetry, such as normal to crystalline layers). Some materials can have multiple such optical axes.

=== Geophysics and geology ===
Seismic anisotropy is the variation of seismic wavespeed with direction. Seismic anisotropy is an indicator of long range order in a material, where features smaller than the seismic wavelength (e.g., crystals, cracks, pores, layers, or inclusions) have a dominant alignment. This alignment leads to a directional variation of elasticity wavespeed. Measuring the effects of anisotropy in seismic data can provide important information about processes and mineralogy in the Earth; significant seismic anisotropy has been detected in the Earth's crust, mantle, and inner core.

Geological formations with distinct layers of sedimentary material can exhibit electrical anisotropy; electrical conductivity in one direction (e.g. parallel to a layer), is different from that in another (e.g. perpendicular to a layer). This property is used in the gas and oil exploration industry to identify hydrocarbon-bearing sands in sequences of sand and shale. Sand-bearing hydrocarbon assets have high resistivity (low conductivity), whereas shales have lower resistivity. Formation evaluation instruments measure this conductivity or resistivity, and the results are used to help find oil and gas in wells. The mechanical anisotropy measured for some of the sedimentary rocks like coal and shale can change with corresponding changes in their surface properties like sorption when gases are produced from the coal and shale reservoirs.

The hydraulic conductivity of aquifers is often anisotropic for the same reason. When calculating groundwater flow to drains or to wells, the difference between horizontal and vertical permeability must be taken into account; otherwise the results may be subject to error.

Most common rock-forming minerals are anisotropic, including quartz and feldspar. Anisotropy in minerals is most reliably seen in their optical properties. These optical properties form the basis of modern mineral identification methods, including those based on artificial intelligence technologies. An example of an isotropic mineral is garnet.

Igneous rock like granite also shows the anisotropy due to the orientation of the minerals during the solidification process.

=== Medical acoustics ===
Anisotropy is also a well-known property in medical ultrasound imaging describing a different resulting echogenicity of soft tissues, such as tendons, when the angle of the transducer is changed. Tendon fibers appear hyperechoic (bright) when the transducer is perpendicular to the tendon, but can appear hypoechoic (darker) when the transducer is angled obliquely. This can be a source of interpretation error for inexperienced practitioners.

=== Materials science and engineering ===
Anisotropy, in materials science, is a material's directional dependence of a physical property. This is a critical consideration for materials selection in engineering applications. A material with physical properties that are symmetric about an axis that is normal to a plane of isotropy is called a transversely isotropic material. Tensor descriptions of material properties can be used to determine the directional dependence of that property. For a monocrystalline material, anisotropy is associated with the crystal symmetry in the sense that more symmetric crystal types have fewer independent coefficients in the tensor description of a given property. When a material is polycrystalline, the directional dependence on properties is often related to the processing techniques it has undergone. A material with randomly oriented grains will be isotropic, whereas materials with texture will be often be anisotropic. Textured materials are often the result of processing techniques like cold rolling, wire drawing, and heat treatment.

Mechanical properties of materials such as Young's modulus, ductility, yield strength, and high-temperature creep rate, are often dependent on the direction of measurement. Fourth-rank tensor properties, like the elastic constants, are anisotropic, even for materials with cubic symmetry. The Young's modulus relates stress and strain when an isotropic material is elastically deformed; to describe elasticity in an anisotropic material, stiffness (or compliance) tensors are used instead.

In metals, anisotropic elasticity behavior is present in all single crystals with three independent coefficients for cubic crystals, for example. For face-centered cubic materials such as nickel and copper, the stiffness is highest along the <111> direction, normal to the close-packed planes, and smallest parallel to <100>. Tungsten is so nearly isotropic at room temperature that it can be considered to have only two stiffness coefficients; aluminium is another metal that is nearly isotropic.

For an isotropic material,
$$G = E/[2(1 + \nu)],$$
where $G$ is the shear modulus, $E$ is the Young's modulus, and $\nu$ is the material's Poisson's ratio. Therefore, for cubic materials, we can think of anisotropy, $a_r$, as the ratio between the empirically determined shear modulus for the cubic material and its (isotropic) equivalent:
$$a_r = \frac{G}{E/[2(1 + \nu)]} = \frac{2(1+\nu)G}{E} \equiv \frac{2 C_{44}}{C_{11} - C_{12}}.$$

The latter expression is known as the Zener ratio, $a_r$, where $C_{ij}$ refers to elastic constants in Voigt (vector-matrix) notation. For an isotropic material, the ratio is one.

Limitation of the Zener ratio to cubic materials is waived in the Tensorial anisotropy index A^{T} that takes into consideration all the 27 components of the fully anisotropic stiffness tensor. It is composed of two major parts $A^I$and $A^A$, the former referring to components existing in cubic tensor and the latter in anisotropic tensor so that $A^T = A^I+A^A .$ This first component includes the modified Zener ratio and additionally accounts for directional differences in the material, which exist in orthotropic material, for instance. The second component of this index $A^A$ covers the influence of stiffness coefficients that are nonzero only for non-cubic materials and remains zero otherwise.

Fiber-reinforced or layered composite materials exhibit anisotropic mechanical properties, due to orientation of the reinforcement material. In many fiber-reinforced composites like carbon fiber or glass fiber based composites, the weave of the material (e.g. unidirectional or plain weave) can determine the extent of the anisotropy of the bulk material. The tunability of orientation of the fibers allows for application-based designs of composite materials, depending on the direction of stresses applied onto the material.

Amorphous materials such as glass and polymers are typically isotropic. Due to the highly randomized orientation of macromolecules in polymeric materials, polymers are in general described as isotropic. However, mechanically gradient polymers can be engineered to have directionally dependent properties through processing techniques or introduction of anisotropy-inducing elements. Researchers have built composite materials with aligned fibers and voids to generate anisotropic hydrogels, in order to mimic hierarchically ordered biological soft matter. 3D printing, especially Fused Deposition Modeling, can introduce anisotropy into printed parts. This is because FDM is designed to extrude and print layers of thermoplastic materials. This creates materials that are strong when tensile stress is applied in parallel to the layers and weak when the material is perpendicular to the layers.

=== Microfabrication ===
Anisotropic etching techniques (such as deep reactive-ion etching) are used in microfabrication processes to create well defined microscopic features with a high aspect ratio. These features are commonly used in MEMS (microelectromechanical systems) and microfluidic devices, where the anisotropy of the features is needed to impart desired optical, electrical, or physical properties to the device. Anisotropic etching can also refer to certain chemical etchants used to etch a certain material preferentially over certain crystallographic planes (e.g., KOH etching of silicon [100] produces pyramid-like structures)

=== Neuroscience ===
Diffusion tensor imaging is an MRI technique that involves measuring the fractional anisotropy of the random motion (Brownian motion) of water molecules in the brain. Water molecules located in fiber tracts are more likely to move anisotropically, since they are restricted in their movement (they move more in the dimension parallel to the fiber tract rather than in the two dimensions orthogonal to it), whereas water molecules dispersed in the rest of the brain have less restricted movement and therefore display more isotropy. This difference in fractional anisotropy is exploited to create a map of the fiber tracts in the brains of the individual.

=== Remote sensing and radiative transfer modeling ===
Radiance fields (see Bidirectional reflectance distribution function (BRDF)) from a reflective surface are often not isotropic in nature. This makes calculations of the total energy being reflected from any scene a difficult quantity to calculate. In remote sensing applications, anisotropy functions can be derived for specific scenes, immensely simplifying the calculation of the net reflectance or (thereby) the net irradiance of a scene. For example, let the BRDF be $\gamma(\Omega_i, \Omega_v)$ where 'i' denotes incident direction and 'v' denotes viewing direction (as if from a satellite or other instrument). And let P be the Planar Albedo, which represents the total reflectance from the scene.
$$P(\Omega_i) = \int_{\Omega_v} \gamma(\Omega_i, \Omega_v)\hat{n} \cdot d\hat\Omega_v$$
$$A(\Omega_i, \Omega_v) = \frac{\gamma(\Omega_i, \Omega_v)}{P(\Omega_i)}$$

It is of interest because, with knowledge of the anisotropy function as defined, a measurement of the BRDF from a single viewing direction (say, $\Omega_v$) yields a measure of the total scene reflectance (planar albedo) for that specific incident geometry (say, $\Omega_i$).

== See also ==
- Circular symmetry
