= Mechanically gradient polymers =

Polymer gradient materials (PGM) are a class of polymers with gradually changing mechanical properties along a defined direction creating an anisotropic material. These materials can be defined based upon the direction and the steepness of the gradient used and can display gradient or graded transitions. A wide range of methods can be used to create these gradients including gradients in reinforcing fillers, cross-link density or porosity to name a few. 3D printing has been used to combine several of these methods in one manufacturing technique.

These materials can be inspired by nature where mechanical gradients are used commonly to improve interfaces between two dissimilar surfaces. When two materials that have different moduli are connected together in a bilayer, this can create a weak junction, whereas a mechanical gradient can reduce the stress and strain of the connection. In contrast, a butt joint that gives a junction between materials with little to no gradient has been shown to be weaker than the homogenous components.

Mechanically gradient polymers are not manufactured as extensively as can be found in nature, and there can also be unintended gradients during the manufacturing process. Materials are not always completely uniform despite the intentions of the manufacturer, and these unintended gradients may weaken the material rather than improve. Therefore, mechanical gradients must be properly applied to the particular application to prevent introduction of instabilities.

== Methods ==
=== Gradient in reinforcing filler ===
Reinforcing fillers such as carbon nanotubes that have high mechanical moduli have been used commonly to create polymer composites with high strength and toughness. Since the modulus and filler amount are linked, by varying the amount of filler across the polymer the modulus will similarly change. Additionally, since long nanofillers create anisotropic moduli, if the direction of the nanofiller could be modified along the length of the polymer, the modulus gradient could also be tuned in this manner.

=== Gradient in crosslink density ===
A common approach to increasing the mechanical strength of polymers includes changing the crosslinking density of the polymer. Crosslinks connect the polymer chains creating a web that resists deformation. Therefore, increasing the crosslinking density in a section of a polymer will increase the modulus in this location. This can be used to create a mechanical gradient if the crosslinking density changes across the polymer. A common approach to achieving this is using a photopolymerization process which with changes in UV exposure you can change the degree of crosslinking or polymerization in the area exposed. In a similar manner, the amount of initiator or crosslinker could be varied across the sample creating a similar effect.

=== Gradient in porosity ===
Porosity gradients in polymers result in spatial variations in pore morphology and density, similar to structures observed in foams and natural materials like bone. These gradients introduce mechanical variation across the material by altering local stiffness and viscosity, primarily through a reduction in modulus with increasing porosity. A notable example is asymmetric polymer membranes created via solvent-induced phase separation, which exhibit a graded structure suited for liquid–liquid separation. Such membranes have widespread applications across industries, including water treatment, biopharmaceuticals, and food processing.

=== Gradient via spatial control ===
Gradient polymers in additive manufacturing enable the creation of parts with spatially tunable properties, expanding the potential for advanced functional components. Beyond geometric design freedom, this approach allows precise control over material composition within complex architectures, enabling functionally graded structures with enhanced adaptability, performance, and application-specific functionality. It is a simple, scalable, and cost-effective method compatible with a wide range of polymer systems. Notable examples include the 3D printing of biocompatible porous PDMS scaffolds shaped into organ-like structures for biomedical use, and gradient interpenetrating polymer networks (IPNs) embedded within elastomeric lattices to significantly improve and tailor energy absorption in protective applications.

== Applications ==
=== Nature ===
There are many examples in nature where soft tissue and hard surfaces are connected by a mechanical gradient to improve the fracture and impact resistance. Examples include mussels that connect to hard rocks by the mussel byssus which connects back to the soft muscle of the foot. A more extreme example is the squid beak which has an extremely hard tip required to kill and dismember its prey which connects back to the soft flesh of the body of the squid. Without the mechanically gradient in the beak, the squid would be unable to withstand the high impacts despite its hardness since it would break off from the body at the junction between the materials.

=== Biomedical Implants ===
As mentioned above, many systems in nature incorporate mechanical gradients, and similarly for biomedical implants these gradients can be useful. Many implants are stiff and can cause damage to the surrounding tissues due to this difference in stiffness. This is a problem for instance in microelectrodes implanted into the brain which is extremely soft. The damage caused can create a buildup of fibrous tissue which can then interfere with the signal between the electrode and the brain. Similarly, in knee and hip implants, there is a need for high integration between the strong bone and the cartilage and tissue. Otherwise problems such as stress shielding can occur where the bone degenerates due to the implant having too strong of a modulus.
