= 1/4 + 1/16 + 1/64 + 1/256 + ⋯ =

Infinite series summable to 1/3

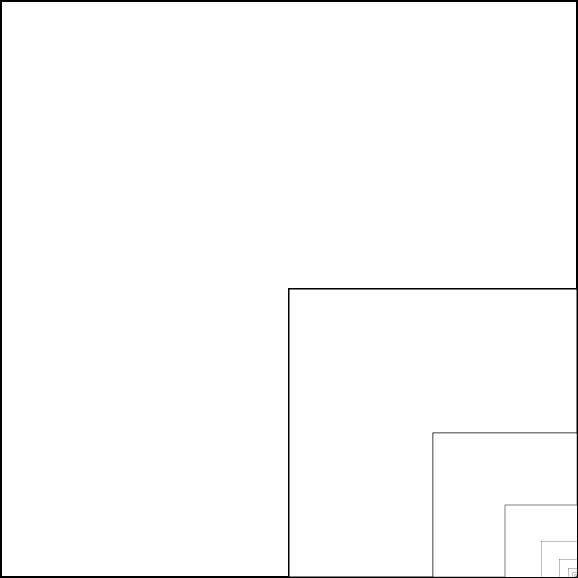
Archimedes' figure with a = 3/4

In mathematics, the infinite series 1/4 + 1/16 + 1/64 + 1/256 + ⋯ is an example of one of the first infinite series to be summed in the history of mathematics; it was used by Archimedes circa 250–200 BC. As it is a geometric series with first term 1/4 and common ratio 1/4, its sum is
$$\sum_{n=1}^\infty \frac{1}{4^n}=\frac {\frac 1 4} {1 - \frac 1 4} = \frac 1 3.$$

== Visual demonstrations ==
3s = 1.

The series 1/4 + 1/16 + 1/64 + 1/256 + ⋯ lends itself to some particularly simple visual proofs because a square and a triangle both divide into four similar pieces, each of which contains 1/4 the area of the original.

In the figure on the left, if the large square is taken to have area 1, then the largest black square has area 1/2 × 1/2 = 1/4. Likewise, the second largest black square has area 1/16, and the third largest black square has area 1/64. The area taken up by all of the black squares together is therefore 1/4 + 1/16 + 1/64 + ⋯, and this is also the area taken up by the gray squares and the white squares. Since these three areas cover the unit square, the figure demonstrates that
$$3\left(\frac14+\frac{1}{4^2}+\frac{1}{4^3}+\frac{1}{4^4}+\cdots\right) = 1.$$

Archimedes' own illustration, adapted at top, was slightly different, being closer to the equation

3s = 1 again

$$\sum_{n=1}^\infty \frac{3}{4^n}=\frac34+\frac{3}{4^2}+\frac{3}{4^3}+\frac{3}{4^4}+\cdots = 1.$$
See below for details on Archimedes' interpretation.

The same geometric strategy also works for triangles, as in the figure on the right: if the large triangle has area 1, then the largest black triangle has area 1/4, and so on. The figure as a whole has a self-similarity between the large triangle and its upper sub-triangle. A related construction making the figure similar to all three of its corner pieces produces the Sierpiński triangle.

== Proof by Archimedes ==
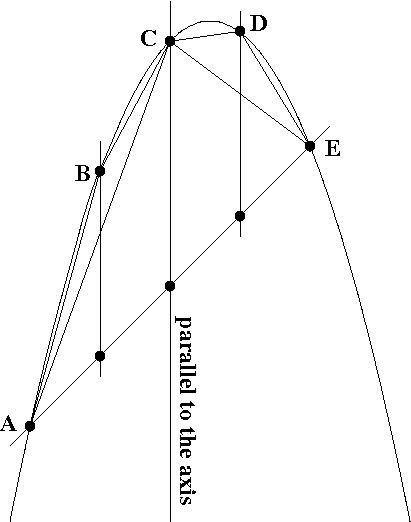
This curve is a parabola. The dots on the secant line AE are equally spaced. Archimedes showed that the sum of the areas of triangles ABC and CDE is 1/4 of the area of triangle ACE. He then constructs another layer of four triangles atop those, the sum of whose areas is 1/4 of the sum of the areas of ABC and CDE, and then another layer of eight triangles atop that, having 1/4 of that area, and so on. He concluded that the area between the secant line and the curve is 4/3 the area of triangle ACE.

Archimedes encounters the series in his work Quadrature of the Parabola. He finds the area inside a parabola by the method of exhaustion, and he gets a series of triangles; each stage of the construction adds an area 1/4 times the area of the previous stage. His desired result is that the total area is 4/3 times the area of the first stage. To get there, he takes a break from parabolas to introduce an algebraic lemma:

Proposition 23. Given a series of areas A, B, C, D, ... , Z, of which A is the greatest, and each is equal to four times the next in order, then
$$A + B + C + D + \cdots + Z + \frac13 Z = \frac43 A.$$

Archimedes proves the proposition by first calculating
$$\begin{array}{rcl}
\displaystyle B+C+\cdots+Z+\frac{B}{3}+\frac{C}{3}+\cdots+\frac{Z}{3} & = &\displaystyle \frac{4B}{3}+\frac{4C}{3}+\cdots+\frac{4Z}{3} \\[1em]
& = &\displaystyle \frac13(A+B+\cdots+Y).
\end{array}$$
On the other hand,
$$\frac{B}{3}+\frac{C}{3}+\cdots+\frac{Y}{3} = \frac13(B+C+\cdots+Y).$$

Subtracting this equation from the previous equation yields
$$B+C+\cdots+Z+\frac{Z}{3} = \frac13 A$$
and adding A to both sides gives the desired result.

Today, a more standard phrasing of Archimedes' proposition is that the partial sums of the series 1 + 1/4 + 1/16 + ⋯ are:
$$1+\frac{1}{4}+\frac{1}{4^2}+\cdots+\frac{1}{4^n}=\frac{1-\left(\frac14\right)^{n+1}}{1-\frac14}.$$

This form can be proved by multiplying both sides by 1 − 1/4 and observing that all but the first and the last of the terms on the left-hand side of the equation cancel in pairs. The same strategy works for any finite geometric series.

== The limit ==
Archimedes' Proposition 24 applies the finite (but indeterminate) sum in Proposition 23 to the area inside a parabola by a double reductio ad absurdum. He does not quite take the limit of the above partial sums, but in modern calculus this step is easy enough:
$$\lim_{n\to\infty} \frac{1-\left(\frac14\right)^{n+1}}{1-\frac14} = \frac{1}{1-\frac14} = \frac43.$$

Since the sum of an infinite series is defined as the limit of its partial sums,
$$1+\frac14+\frac{1}{4^2}+\frac{1}{4^3}+\cdots = \frac43.$$
