= Arithmetic circuit complexity =

Standard model in theoretical computer science

In computational complexity theory, arithmetic circuits are the standard model for computing polynomials. Informally, an arithmetic circuit takes as inputs either variables or numbers, and is allowed to either add or multiply two expressions it has already computed. Arithmetic circuits provide a formal way to understand the complexity of computing polynomials. The basic type of question in this line of research is "what is the most efficient way to compute a given polynomial $f$?"

== Definitions ==
A simple arithmetic circuit computing $(x_1 + x_2) x_2 (x_2 +1)$.

An arithmetic circuit $C$ over the field $F$ and the set of variables $x_1, \ldots, x_n$ is a directed acyclic graph as follows. Every node in it with indegree zero is called an input gate and is labeled by either a variable $x_i$ or a field element in $F.$ Every other gate is labeled by either $+$ or $\times;$ in the first case it is a sum gate and in the second a product gate. An arithmetic formula is a circuit in which every gate has outdegree one (and so the underlying graph is a directed tree).

A circuit has two complexity measures associated with it: size and depth. The size of a circuit is the number of gates in it, and the depth of a circuit is the length of the longest directed path in it. For example, the circuit in the figure has size six and depth two.

An arithmetic circuit computes a polynomial in the following natural way. An input gate computes the polynomial it is labeled by. A sum gate $v$ computes the sum of the polynomials computed by its children (a gate $u$ is a child of $v$ if the directed edge $(v,u)$ is in the graph). A product gate computes the product of the polynomials computed by its children. Consider the circuit in the figure, for example: the input gates compute (from left to right) $x_1, x_2$ and $1,$ the sum gates compute $x_1 + x_2$ and $x_2 + 1,$ and the product gate computes $(x_1 + x_2) x_2 (x_2 +1).$

== Overview ==
Given a polynomial $f,$ we may ask ourselves what is the best way to compute it — for example, what is the smallest size of a circuit computing $f.$ The answer to this question consists of two parts. The first part is finding some circuit that computes $f;$ this part is usually called upper bounding the complexity of $f.$ The second part is showing that no other circuit can do better; this part is called lower bounding the complexity of $f.$ Although these two tasks are strongly related, proving lower bounds is usually harder, since in order to prove a lower bound one needs to argue about all circuits at the same time.

Note that we are interested in the formal computation of polynomials, rather than the functions that the polynomials define. For example, consider the polynomial $x^2 +x;$ over the field of two elements this polynomial represents the zero function, but it is not the zero polynomial. This is one of the differences between the study of arithmetic circuits and the study of Boolean circuits. In Boolean complexity, one is mostly interested in computing a function, rather than some representation of it (in our case, a representation by a polynomial). This is one of the reasons that make Boolean complexity harder than arithmetic complexity. The study of arithmetic circuits may also be considered as one of the intermediate steps towards the study of the Boolean case, which we hardly understand.

=== Upper bounds ===
As part of the study of the complexity of computing polynomials, some clever circuits (alternatively algorithms) were found. A well-known example is Strassen's algorithm for matrix product. The straightforward way for computing the product of two $n \times n$ matrices requires a circuit of size order $n^3.$ Strassen showed that we can, in fact, multiply two matrices using a circuit of size roughly $n^{2.807}.$ Strassen's basic idea is a clever way for multiplying $2 \times 2$ matrices. This idea is the starting point of the best theoretical way for multiplying two matrices that takes time roughly $n^{2.376}.$

Another interesting story lies behind the computation of the determinant of an $n \times n$ matrix. The naive way for computing the determinant requires circuits of size roughly $n!.$ Nevertheless, we know that there are circuits of size polynomial in $n$ for computing the determinant. These circuits, however, have depth that is linear in $n.$ Berkowitz came up with an improvement: a circuit of size polynomial in $n,$ but of depth $O(\log^2(n)).$

We would also like to mention the best circuit known for the permanent of an $n \times n$ matrix. As for the determinant, the naive circuit for the permanent has size roughly $n!.$ However, for the permanent the best circuit known has size roughly $2^n,$ which is given by Ryser's formula: for an $n \times n$ matrix $X = (x_{i,j}),$

$$\operatorname{perm}(X)=(-1)^n\sum_{S \subseteq \{1,\ldots,n\}}(-1)^{|S|} \prod_{i=1}^n \sum_{j \in S} x_{i,j}$$

(this is a depth three circuit).

=== Lower bounds ===
In terms of proving lower bounds, our knowledge is very limited. Since we study the computation of formal polynomials, we know that polynomials of very large degree require large circuits, for example, a polynomial of degree $2^{2^n}$ require a circuit of size roughly $2^n.$ So, the main goal is to prove lower bound for polynomials of small degree, say, polynomial in $n.$ In fact, as in many areas of mathematics, counting arguments tell us that there are polynomials of polynomial degree that require circuits of superpolynomial size. However, these counting arguments usually do not improve our understanding of computation. The following problem is the main open problem in this area of research: find an explicit polynomial of polynomial degree that requires circuits of superpolynomial size.

The state of the art is a $\Omega(n \log d)$ lower bound for the size of a circuit computing, e.g., the polynomial $x_1^d + \cdots + x_n^d$ given by Strassen and by Baur and Strassen. More precisely, Strassen used Bézout's theorem to show that any circuit that simultaneously computes the $n$ polynomials $x_1^d, \ldots, x_n^d$ is of size $\Omega(n \log d),$ and later Baur and Strassen showed the following: given an arithmetic circuit of size $s$ computing a polynomial $f,$ one can construct a new circuit of size at most $O(s)$ that computes $f$ and all the $n$ partial derivatives of $f.$ Since the partial derivatives of $x_1^d + \cdots + x_n^d$ are $dx_1^{d-1}, \ldots, dx_n^{d-1},$ the lower bound of Strassen applies to $x_1^d + \cdots + x_n^d$ as well. This is one example where some upper bound helps in proving lower bounds; the construction of a circuit given by Baur and Strassen implies a lower bound for more general polynomials.

The lack of ability to prove lower bounds brings us to consider simpler models of computation. Some examples are: monotone circuits (in which all the field elements are nonnegative real numbers), constant depth circuits, and multilinear circuits (in which every gate computes a multilinear polynomial). These restricted models have been studied extensively and some understanding and results were obtained.

== Algebraic P and NP ==
The most interesting open problem in computational complexity theory is the P vs. NP problem. Roughly, this problem is to determine whether a given problem can be solved as easily as it can be shown that a solution exists to the given problem. In his seminal work Valiant suggested an algebraic analog of this problem, the VP vs. VNP problem.

The class VP is the algebraic analog of P; it is the class of polynomials $f$ of polynomial degree that have polynomial size circuits over a fixed field $K.$ The class VNP is the analog of NP. VNP can be thought of as the class of polynomials $f$ of polynomial degree such that given a monomial we can determine its coefficient in $f$ efficiently, with a polynomial size circuit.

One of the basic notions in complexity theory is the notion of completeness. Given a class of polynomials (such as VP or VNP), a complete polynomial $f$ for this class is a polynomial with two properties: (1) it is part of the class, and (2) any other polynomial $g$ in the class is easier than $f,$ in the sense that if $f$ has a small circuit then so does $g.$ Valiant showed that the permanent is complete for the class VNP. So in order to show that VP is not equal to VNP, one needs to show that the permanent does not have polynomial size circuits. This remains an outstanding open problem.

== Depth reduction ==
One benchmark in our understanding of the computation of polynomials is the work of Valiant, Skyum, Berkowitz and Rackoff. They showed that if a polynomial $f$ of degree $r$ has a circuit of size $s,$ then $f$ also has a circuit of size polynomial in $r$ and $s$ of depth $O(\log(r) \log(s)).$ For example, any polynomial of degree $n$ that has a polynomial size circuit, also has a polynomial size circuit of depth roughly $\log^2 (n).$ This result generalizes the circuit of Berkowitz to any polynomial of polynomial degree that has a polynomial size circuit (such as the determinant). The analog of this result in the Boolean setting is believed to be false.

One corollary of this result is a simulation of circuits by relatively small formulas, formulas of quasipolynomial size: if a polynomial $f$ of degree $r$ has a circuit of size $s,$ then it has a formula of size $s^{O(\log(r))}.$ This simulation is easier than the depth reduction of Valiant el al. and was shown earlier by Hyafil.

== See also ==
- Polynomial evaluation for a more general and less formal discussion of the complexity of polynomial evaluation.
